= C. Robert Wieser =

C. Robert Wieser (January 19, 1919 – March 1, 2011) was an American electrical engineer and later became a developer of electrical and computing technology. He was especially and particularly noted for having contributed to the development of the Cape Cod Air Defense system (Cape Cod Air Force Station) and SAGE system.

Wieser directed the first successful testing of the technology necessary for the creation of an airborne interception system (using radar and computers), which from this embryonic state, would later develop into the Semi-Automatic Ground Environment system (SAGE). The SAGE system led to the development of technology known as packet switching, which contributed directly, from being a composite element of technology, to the creation of the ARPANET and ultimately the Internet.

== Short biography ==
Wieser was born Charles Robert Wieser in New Rochelle, New York on January 19, 1919.

The following information shows a biographical history of C. Robert Wieser made using three sources:

- 1940 - graduated from MIT with a Bachelor in Science in Electrical Engineering and a Masters of Science in the subject Electrical Engineering.
- from 1940 to 1942 - worked for the Boston Edison Company.
- worked for MIT Servornechanisms Laboratory, developing the application of the Whirlwind I to air traffic control and subsequently to air defence usage (circa 1949).
- 1951 - joined the MIT Lincoln Laboratory, where he was leader of a group developing the Cape Cod Air Defense Direction Center, and involved in the preparation of the operational and mathematical specifications for the SAGE air defence system. Later he was appointed as head, assistant director, and finally as deputy director of the Systems Division.
- 1968 - was employed at the Office of the Secretary of Defense.
- 1971 - appointed as director of the Advanced Weapons Programs within the Douglas Astronautics Company.
- 1982 - vice president and general manager of the Western Division of Physical Dynamics, Inc., RES Operations
- 1985 - Director of Engineering at Science Applications International Corporation (Newport Beach, California).

Wieser died on March 1, 2011, aged 92.

== See also ==
- Jay Forrester
- J. C. R. Licklider
