= Perry O. Crawford Jr. =

American computer engineer (1917–2006)

Perry O. Crawford, Jr.
- Born: August 9, 1917; Medford, Oregon, U.S.
- Died: December 13, 2006 (aged 89); Mequon, Wisconsin, U.S.
- Occupation: Engineer

Perry Orson Crawford, Jr. (August 9, 1917 – December 13, 2006) was an American computer pioneer credited as being the first to fully realize and promote the value of digital, as opposed to analog, computers for real-time applications. This was in 1945 while advising Jay Forrester in developing flight simulators and anti-aircraft fire control devices during World War II, before practical digital computers had been produced. Twelve years later, his similar foresight on related issues led to his heading the design team for IBM's SABRE project, the ticketing system for American Airlines, the first large-scale commercial application of real-time computer systems, which became the model for on-line transaction processing.

== Early life and education ==
Crawford was born in Medford, Oregon, where his father, Perry Crawford Sr., an engineering graduate of Stanford University, oversaw construction on the Klamath River Hydroelectric Project. His mother, Irma Zschokke Crawford, also a Stanford graduate, was an artist and a descendant of the Swiss writer and revolutionary figure, Heinrich Zschokke. When his father became president of American Utilities Service Corporation in Chicago, Crawford attended New Trier Township High School in Winnetka, Illinois.

Crawford entered the Massachusetts Institute of Technology in 1936 to study electrical engineering and came to work under Vannevar Bush, with fellow student Claude Shannon, on the differential analyzer. The theses for his two degrees (bachelor's and master's) are considered to be among the earliest modern computer design documents.

His B.Sc. thesis, "Instrumental Analysis in Matrix Algebra" was completed in 1939. In summary, the thesis:

Sketches the design of "an automatically controlled calculating machine" capable of performing a variety of matrix calculations, and incorporating means for scanning digital data represented on punched tape, for adding, subtracting, multiplying, and dividing two numbers, and for storing and printing or punching the data. A punched tape was to be used for sequence control, which would specify the selection of the numbers to be operated on, the operation to be performed, and the disposal of the result.

When fellow student Shannon completed his doctorate, Crawford succeeded him as a postgraduate student in the Center for Analysis. His M.Sc. thesis, "Automatic Control by Arithmetic Operations" (1942), continued the theme from his earlier thesis:

"It is the purpose of this thesis to describe the elements and operation of a calculating system for performing one of the operations in the control of anti-aircraft gunfire, which is, namely, the prediction of the future position of the target. It is to be emphasized at the outset that little progress has been made toward the construction of automatic electronic calculating systems for any purpose. ... It can be proposed only that this thesis shows a possible approach to the design of a number of calculating system elements and to the structure of an arithmetical predictor. ... In this introduction, equipment for performing the operations occurring in automatic calculating is described. This equipment includes electronic switching elements, devices for multiplying two numbers, finding a function of a variable, recording numbers, translating mechanical displacements into numerical data, and for translating numerical data into mechanical displacements."

The thesis included a description of a matrix "selector switch," for implementing an arbitrary function or control sequence. Independently invented by Jan A. Rajchman, this device was incorporated, with acknowledgments, in the ENIAC. in a 1975 interview, J. Presper Eckert, a designer of the ENIAC, described another contribution:

I had gotten the idea of using disks for memory, digital memory, from a master's thesis written by Perry Crawford at MIT. He had not built any such disks; it was just speculation.

== Career ==
=== Office of Naval Research ===
From 1942 to 1945 Crawford served as a civilian attached to the Navy's Special Devices Section (a predecessor of the Naval Air Warfare Center Training Systems Division) at Sands Point, Long Island. In 1946 this became the Special Devices Center under the newly created Office of Naval Research (ONR). Crawford supervised the Navy Ballistics Computation Program until September 1948 when he accepted a temporary position with the Research and Development Board of the Department of Defense. As head of the computer section in ONR he came into contact with Jay Forrester at MIT who, with his collaborator Robert Everett (computer scientist), headed a project that had roots in developing flight simulators for pilot training and evolved into the Whirlwind Project which in turn prepared the way for the air-defense application SAGE (Semi-Automatic Ground Environment).

From Forrester's point of view, Crawford was a significant contributor and supporter whom he described as "uninhibited, not restrained by protocol or chain of command, and a freewheeling intervener in many circles of activity":

Perry Crawford was an electrical engineering graduate of MIT and a person with continually unfolding visions of futures that others had not yet glimpsed. He was the first person in about 1946 to call my attention to the possibility of digital rather than analog computers. He was always looking, listening, and projecting new ideas into the future. ...

In the fall of 1947, following conversations with Perry Crawford, we wrote two documents, numbered L-1 and L-2, that showed how digital computers could manage a Naval task force and interpret radar data.

In July 1948, at a conference at the University of California in Los Angeles, Crawford proposed using computers for the control of aircraft. On March 18, 1949, at a panel meeting of the Research and Development Board, he pushed the idea of digital computers in an air defense system.

Crawford also contributed to the Moore School Lectures with a talk entitled "Applications of Digital Computation Involving Continuous Input and Output Variables" (August 5, 1946). It discussed such topics as missile and combat simulations and was originally classified as confidential and not published until (Campbell-Kelly & Williams 1985, pp. 375–391). He stressed his conviction that these applications could best be performed with the aid of digital computers, a thesis many did not agree with at the time. He gave a talk at a session on electronic computers at the 1947 conference of the Institute of Radio Engineers on "Applications of Electronic Digital Computers" which was summarized in the program:

A discussion of computer applications, including scientific calculations, wave propagation, and aerodynamics. Comments will be made on the future relation of analogue and digital computers, and also on the possible engineering application of electronic digital computers to automatic process and factory control, air traffic control, and business calculations.

=== International Business Machines ===
Crawford left his civilian service in the Navy in 1952 to join IBM. The company had been working with the military on SAGE and anticipated further developments in real-time applications. in 1954 Thomas J. Watson, Jr., son of IBM's founder, oversaw Crawford's placement, along with Hans Peter Luhn, to head the design team for creating a digital computer system for managing American Airline's reservations and ticketing. Named SABRE (Semi-Automatic Research Environment), it soon grew to managing the total operation: flight planning, crew schedules, special meals, etc.

The project was at the time easily the largest civilian computerization task ever undertaken, involving some 200 technical personnel producing a million lines of program code. ...

By the early 1970s all the major carriers possessed reliable real-time systems and communications networks that had become an essential component of their operations, second in importance only to the airplanes themselves.

Crawford continued in IBM until his retirement in 1988 working towards what he saw as a necessary "computer transition" as outlined in his 1979 publication below, but otherwise rarely publicized outside of IBM. In a 1980 interview R. Blair Smith, the IBM marketing manager whose contact with American Airlines initiated SABRE, described Crawford's Imaging project:

It's a shame we didn't bring it out, but there was a great need for Perry Crawford's concept of imaging. ... Perry's idea was to eliminate typical application programming altogether by having a master program; then have all of the data concerned with, say, running a given business available and identified in the computer. Then if somebody wanted a report of any kind, all he had to do was to tell the computer what was wanted, identify the data from which it would be drawn, and out would come the result. Now, that's an over-simplification. Obviously it would be terribly complex to do. It was a most difficult job, and it never got off the ground. ... I told him he'd have a tough time, because with the status of programming the way it is today, after all of these years of programming, and the programming languages we have developed, introducing the Imaging concept would be about as difficult as converting the typical American to the metric system today.

== Personal life ==
Crawford married Marguerite (Peggy) Murtagh (1924-1979). They had five children.

== Published works ==
- 1968. “Why CAI [computer aided instruction] Is Really a Late, Late Show: The Coming of Age of the Computer.” pp. 20–25 in Goodman, Walter, and Gould, Thomas F. (eds.), New York State Conference on Instructional Uses of the Computer. Final Report. Proceedings of Conference, Tuxedo Park, N. Y., October 3-5, 1968. “The computer and the unified media made possible by the computer become a new foundation of intellectual functioning of all forms including the forms that we call education and including the education of the young.”
- 1969. "The New Views." Systematics: The Journal of The Institute for the Comparative Study of History, Philosophy and the Sciences 6.2, 114–16.
- 1973. "Design Guide for Redesign." Impact on Instructional Improvement (Sponsored by the New York State Association for Supervision and Curriculum Development.) 8.3, 19–28. The article presents an approach to the design of educational systems. The author is described as the president of his local Croton-Harmon Schools Board of Education.
- 1974. "On the Connections Between Data and Things in the Real World." pp. 51–57 in Management of Data Elements in Information processing: Proceedings of a Symposium Sponsored by the American Standards Institute and by the National Bureau of Standards. First National Symposium, National Bureau of Standards, Gaithersburg, Maryland January 24–25, 1974. Washington DC: U.S. Department of Commerce.
- 1979. "Alfred Korzybski and the Computer Transition." General Semantics Bulletin 47, 120–125.

== Bibliography ==
- Green, Tom. Bright Boys: The Making of Information Technology. CRC Press, 2010.
- Redmond, Kent C., and Thomas M. Smith. Project Whirlwind : The History of a Pioneer Computer. Bedford, MA: Digital Press, 1980.
- Redmond, Kent C., and Thomas M. Smith. From Whirlwind to MITRE: The R&D Story of The SAGE Air Defense Computer. Cambridge, MA: The MIT Press, 2000.
