= MIT Lincoln Laboratory =

Federally funded research and development center in Massachusetts

Coordinates: 42.4590°N 71.2674°W

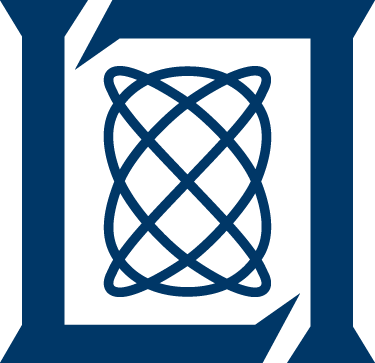
- Formation: July 26, 1951
- Type: Federally funded research and development center
- Headquarters: Hanscom Air Force Base, Lexington, Massachusetts
- Parent organization: Massachusetts Institute of Technology
- Budget: $1 billion (FY 2024)
- Staff: 4,500
- Website: www.ll.mit.edu

MIT Lincoln Laboratory is a federally funded research and development center (FFRDC) managed by the Massachusetts Institute of Technology on behalf of the United States Department of Defense. Located at Hanscom Air Force Base in Lexington, Massachusetts, it was established in 1951 to develop an air defense system for the United States.

An outgrowth of wartime radar research at MIT, the lab's first project produced the Semi-Automatic Ground Environment (SAGE), the first large-scale computerized command-and-control network. After SAGE, the laboratory's mission broadened into radar, space surveillance, satellite communications, and solid-state electronics. Among its largest spinoffs were the MITRE Corporation, spun off in 1958 to manage SAGE deployment, and Digital Equipment Corporation, founded in 1957 by former Lincoln staff. The laboratory's defense work has centered on sensor technology, signal processing, and system prototyping; it designs and tests advanced systems, then transfers the resulting technology to industry for production.

Lincoln also has significant non-defense research programs. Its early computing work produced Reed–Solomon codes and Sketchpad, a foundational program for computer graphics. Its solid-state research contributed to the development of the semiconductor diode laser. For the Federal Aviation Administration, it developed the Terminal Doppler Weather Radar and the Traffic Alert and Collision Avoidance System, both now standard in civil aviation. The Lincoln Near-Earth Asteroid Research (LINEAR) program discovered more near-Earth asteroids than any other survey.

The laboratory employs approximately 4,500 people and operates on an annual budget exceeding $1 billion, the majority of which comes from the Department of Defense. It follows a research-and-prototype model, distinct from defense contractors, and does not compete for production contracts.

== History ==
=== Origins (1949–1951) ===
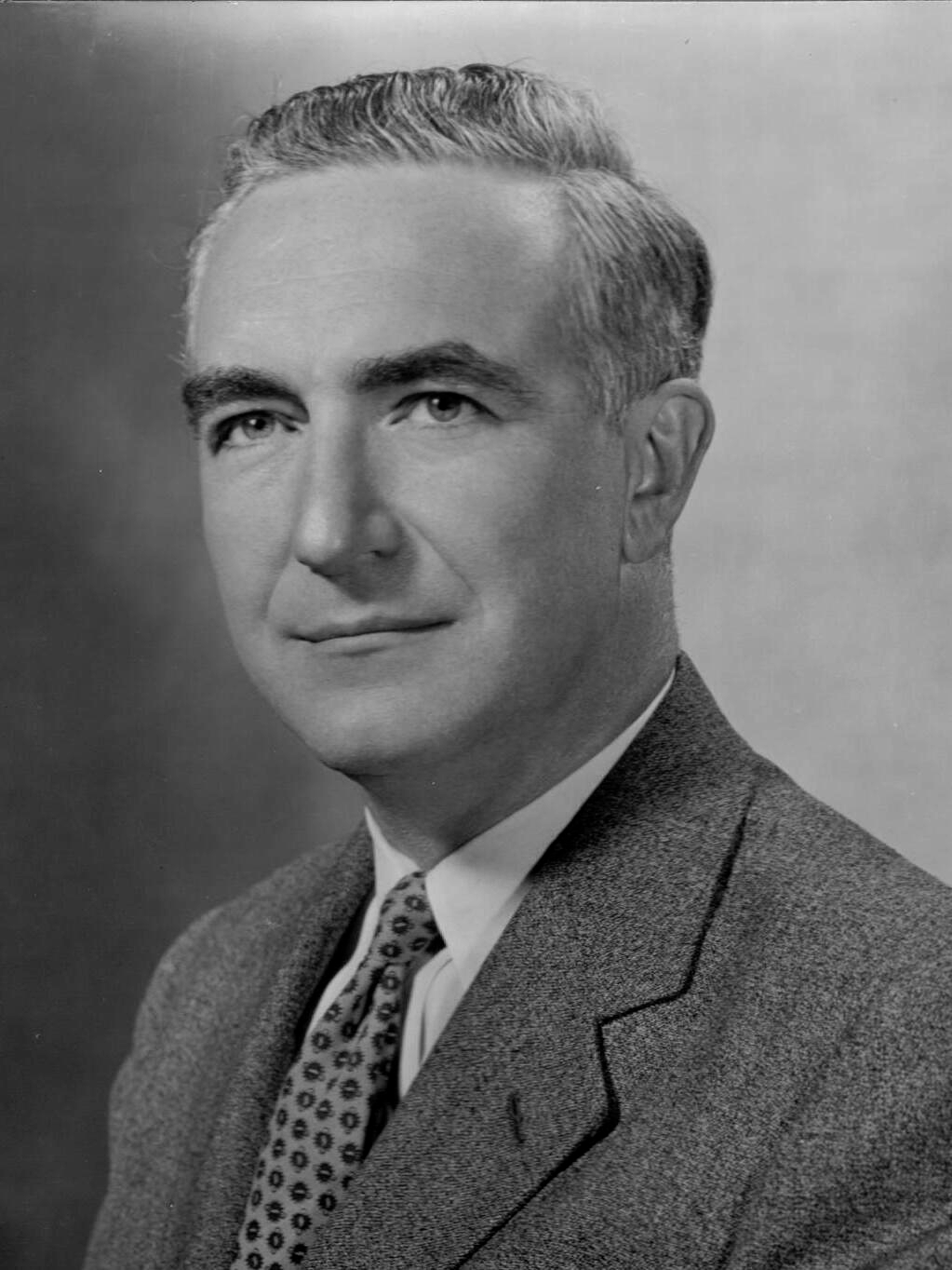
Valley

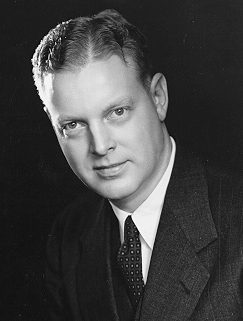
Ridenour

The Soviet Union's first atomic bomb test in August 1949 and the rapid development of long-range bombers confronted the United States with the prospect of a nuclear attack it was poorly equipped to detect. George E. Valley Jr., an MIT physics professor and member of the Air Force Scientific Advisory Board, investigated the problem by visiting radar stations operated by Continental Air Command. He found obsolete equipment, undertrained operators, and high-frequency radios dependent on unpredictable ionospheric conditions. Valley organized the Air Defense Systems Engineering Committee (ADSEC), which reported in 1950 that U.S. air defenses were inadequate and recommended a centralized system using a digital computer to fuse radar data.

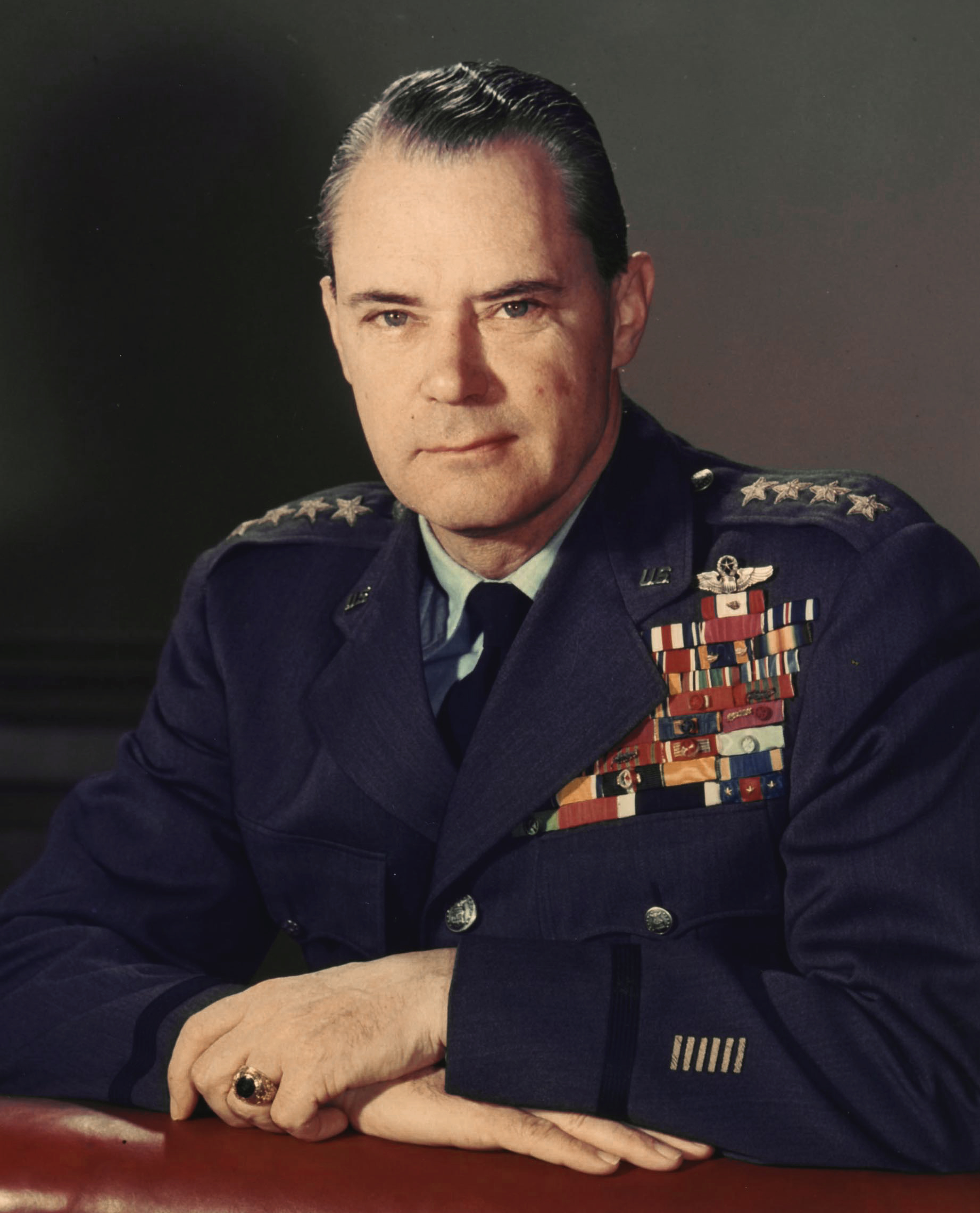
Vandenberg

In December 1950, at the urging of Valley and Louis Ridenour, chairman of the Scientific Advisory Board and a veteran of the wartime MIT Radiation Laboratory, Air Force Chief of Staff Hoyt Vandenberg wrote to MIT president James R. Killian asking the institute to establish a laboratory devoted to air defense. Killian had serious reservations. MIT had devoted itself to the Radiation Laboratory and other large defense projects during the war; taking on another such commitment, he later wrote, risked the institute's reputation if funding proved unstable. Killian asked to conduct a preliminary study first and insisted that any new laboratory operate under the joint sponsorship of the Army, Navy, and Air Force rather than serving a single branch. This arrangement would give MIT broader latitude and reduce dependence on any one patron.

The resulting study, Project Charles (named for the Charles River), ran from February to August 1951 under the direction of F. Wheeler Loomis, a University of Illinois physicist who had served as associate director of the Radiation Laboratory. Of the 28 members, eleven were affiliated with MIT, and the group was deliberately weighted toward individuals with ADSEC experience. The study concluded that a dedicated laboratory was needed and endorsed the concept of a centralized, computer-based air defense system. Ridenour, in conversations with Killian, also argued that the laboratory would seed an electronics industry in whatever state housed it, a prediction Killian found persuasive.

Killian's reservations notwithstanding, the Institute had deep existing ties to defense research, its faculty held prominent advisory roles in the military establishment, and the project promised enormous federal funding at a time when government patronage was transforming American research universities. Killian continued to press for reassurance that MIT's involvement served the national interest, writing to Secretary of the Air Force Thomas K. Finletter in December 1951 that MIT was operating "wholly on a no-gain, no-loss basis" and would withdraw if another contractor could serve better.

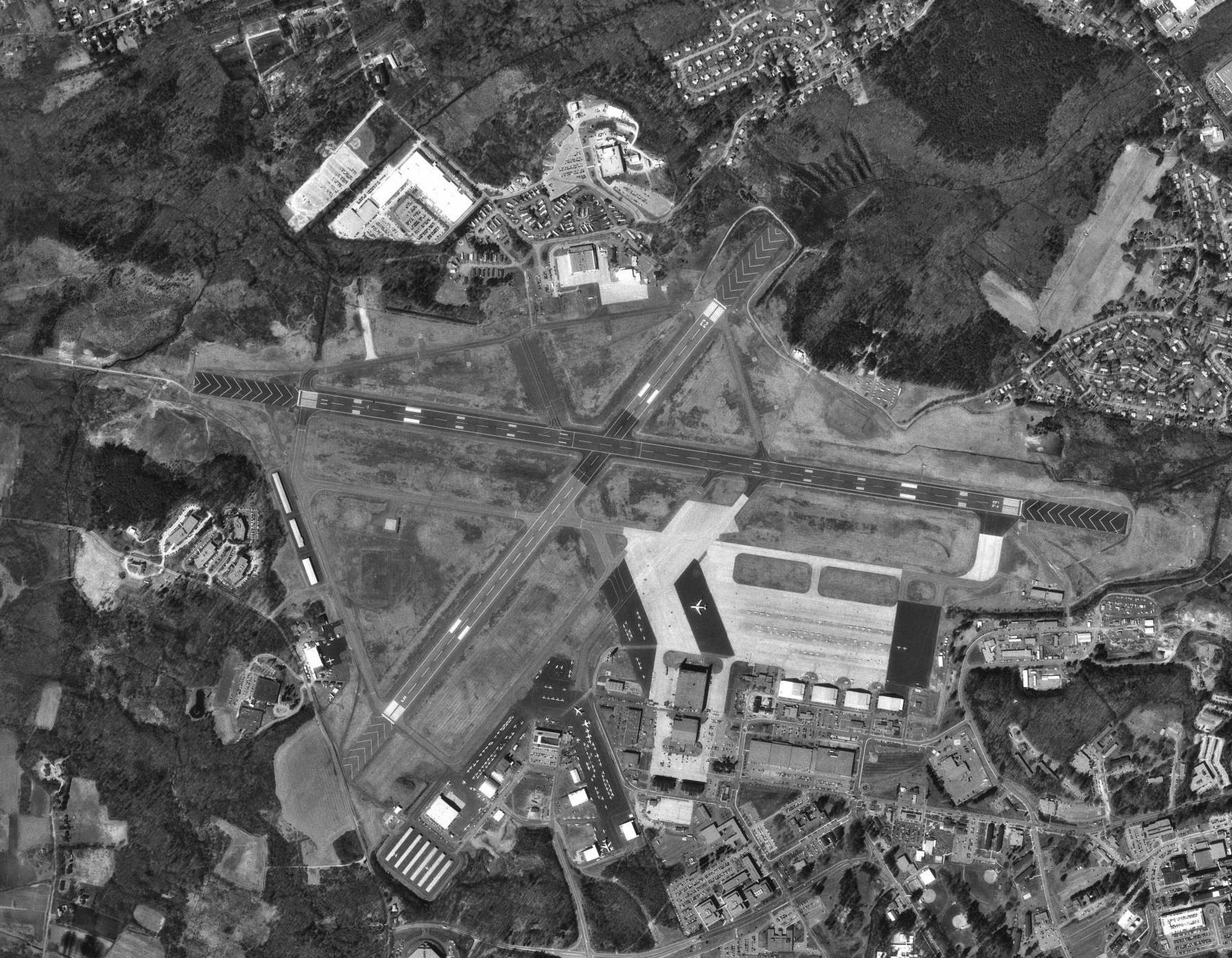
Hanscom Field, straddling the towns of Lincoln, Lexington, and Bedford

Project Lincoln was chartered on July 26, 1951, under a joint-service agreement with the Air Force as prime contractor. The site chosen was Laurence G. Hanscom Field, where the towns of Bedford, Lexington, and Lincoln meet. Project Bedford (on antisubmarine warfare) and a Project Lexington (on nuclear-powered aircraft) were already in use, so Major General Donald L. Putt named it for Lincoln. The original expectation was a five-year undertaking; new employees were told their moving expenses would be covered when the work ended. In April 1952, director Loomis wrote to Killian that the name "Project Lincoln" conveyed "unnecessary implications of impermanence" for an organization of its scale, and the enterprise became Lincoln Laboratory.

=== SAGE and the computing era (1951–1958) ===
Lincoln's first and defining project was the Semi-Automatic Ground Environment (SAGE), a computerized air defense network, which was "the natural culmination" of MIT's electronics research programs over the prior three decades, drawing together studies in long-range radar, communications theory, microwave electronics, and digital computing into the largest military research and development enterprise since the Manhattan Project. Over its first decade SAGE consumed most of Lincoln's budget and ultimately cost the government an estimated $8 billion.

The laboratory inherited Jay Forrester's Whirlwind, an experimental digital computer that had been under development at MIT since 1945, and transformed it into the prototype of a real-time air defense system. In April 1951, a joint ADSEC–Whirlwind team demonstrated for the first time that radar data could be sent over telephone lines to a digital computer, which almost instantly calculated intercept headings for a defending aircraft.

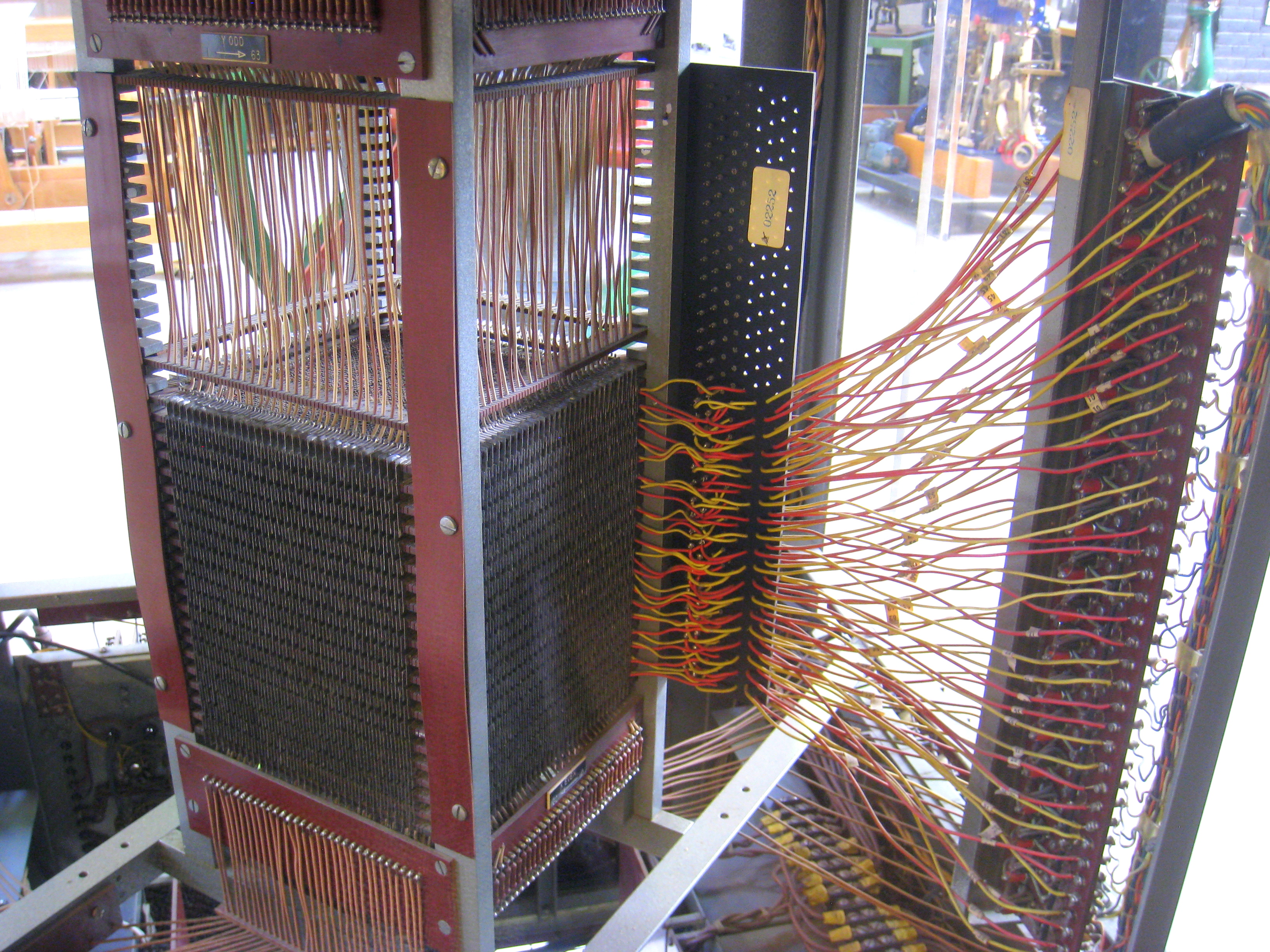
Whirlwind's magnetic core memory stack

Whirlwind's greatest limitation was the unreliability of its electrostatic storage-tube memory. Forrester's development of magnetic-core memory solved this problem. The first bank of core memory was installed in Whirlwind on August 8, 1953; operating speed doubled, the input data rate quadrupled, maintenance time dropped from four hours per day to two hours per week, and the mean time between memory failures jumped from two hours to two weeks. Computer pioneer Herman Goldstine later called the achievement "one of the basic technological discoveries in the entire computer field."

The Cape Cod System, operational by 1953, demonstrated automated air defense in a realistic environment: radar data from multiple sites, processed by a central computer, generated a real-time air picture. By 1955, Whirlwind was operating on a 24-hour schedule with 97.8 percent reliability. Translating the prototype into a deployable system required industrial partners. Lincoln selected IBM to build the production computer, the AN/FSQ-7, a contract that played a significant role in IBM's transformation into the world's largest computer manufacturer. The RAND Corporation took on SAGE programming The section responsible grew so rapidly that it separated from RAND in 1956 to become the System Development Corporation, the first organization devoted to software engineering.

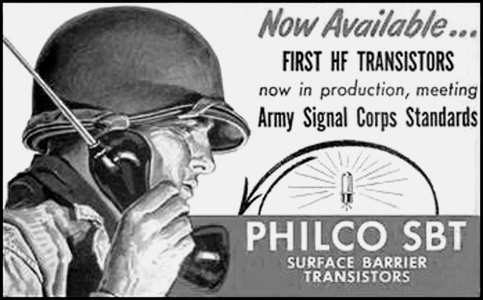
"Tixo" (TX-0) transistors were used in Signal Corps equipment.

Lincoln simultaneously pushed computing hardware forward. The TX-0, completed in 1956, was a transistorized experimental computer; its successor, the TX-2, pioneered interactive computing with displays and light pens. In 1957, Kenneth Olsen and Harlan Anderson, who had worked on core-memory switching and TX-series circuit design, left Lincoln to found Digital Equipment Corporation (DEC).

As SAGE moved from research toward deployment, the character of the laboratory's work shifted. Lincoln's director acknowledged that it had "gradually changed from that of a research organization to that of a technical support contractor." The tension between research and systems engineering would shape Lincoln's institutional identity for decades.

=== New directions and the MITRE spinoff (1958–1970s) ===
In 1958, at the suggestion of Secretary of the Air Force James Douglas, MIT spun off the Digital Computer Division and associated SAGE staff into the MITRE Corporation (from "MIT REsearch"), a new nonprofit with systems engineering responsibility for SAGE deployment. On January 1, 1959, 485 Lincoln employees transferred to MITRE under what all parties described as amicable terms. About a third of Lincoln's professional staff departed. MIT retained no formal connection with MITRE.

The spinoff left Lincoln smaller, its budget declining by nearly 30 percent between 1958 and 1960, and without a clear mission. Valley, back in the MIT physics department, urged Provost Julius Stratton to draw the laboratory closer to campus:

Just as the departure of the SAGE effort poses new problems to Lincoln, it gives MIT a new freedom in administering Lincoln. For previously it was a justifiable MIT policy to hold Lincoln at arm's length so that, for instance, a SAGE catastrophe, if it came, would injure MIT the least. But now SAGE is almost over with, and the bear need no longer be held by the tail. I suggest you embrace it.

Director Carl Overhage likewise urged closer integration, though he questioned whether the Department of Defense would fund the kind of research MIT wanted to do. Overhage steered Lincoln away from systems engineering and toward a research-and-prototype model that would define the laboratory for the following decades.

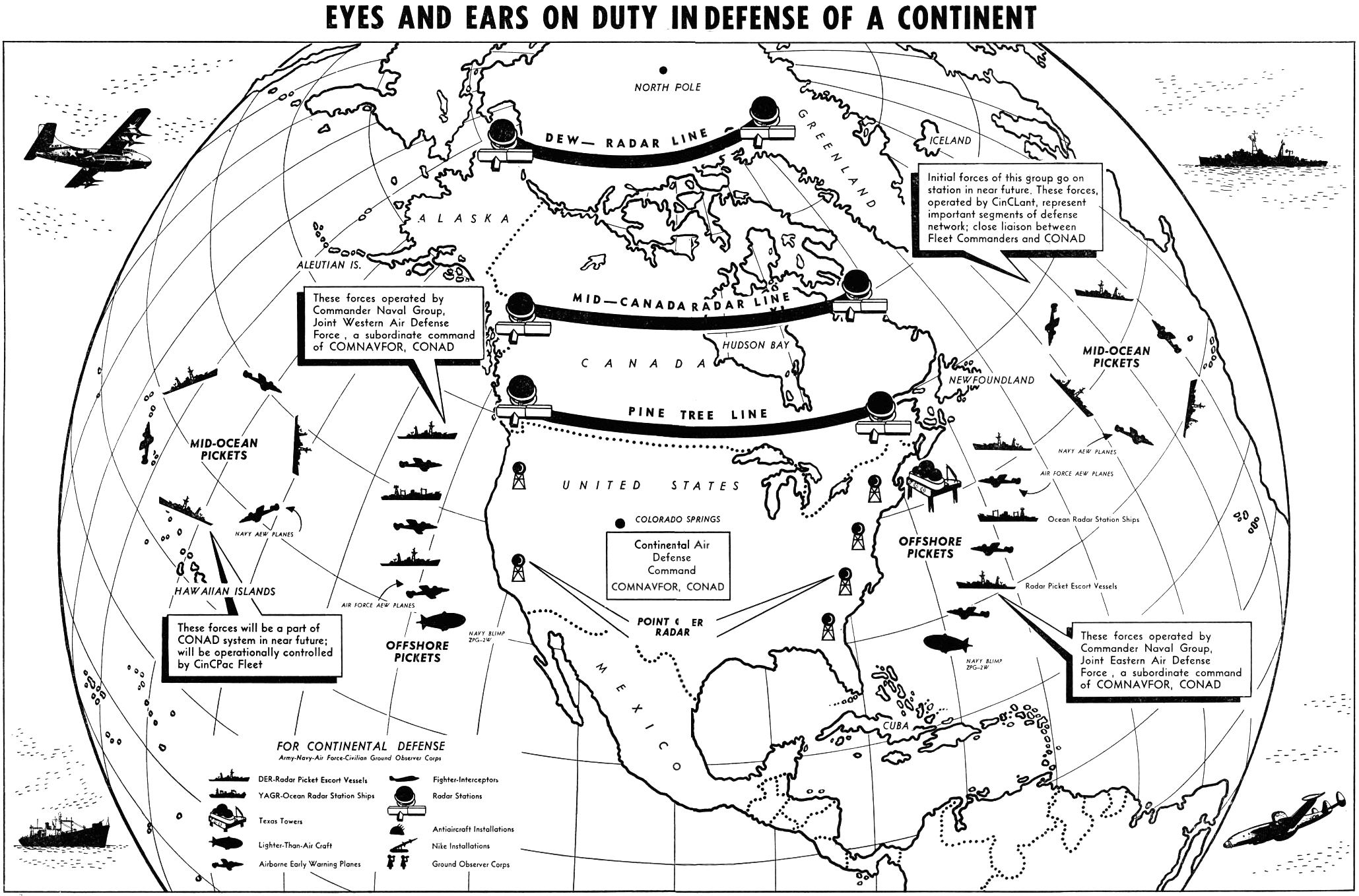
1957 map of the DEW Line system

Lincoln found new missions in areas that built on its SAGE-era expertise. A 1952 Summer Study hosted at the laboratory, which included J. Robert Oppenheimer and Isidor Rabi among its participants, had already recommended constructing a surveillance radar network across the Arctic. The result was the Distant Early Warning (DEW) Line, a chain of radars stretching from Alaska to Greenland. Lincoln contributed radar designs, automatic alarm systems, and long-range communications technology. The DEW Line entered service in 1957.

The shift in the Soviet threat from bombers to intercontinental ballistic missiles reoriented Lincoln's work. Beginning in 1955, the laboratory led the technical development of the Ballistic Missile Early Warning System (BMEWS), designing a prototype UHF tracking radar on Millstone Hill in Westford, Massachusetts. The Millstone radar went into operation in fall 1957, just in time to detect radar returns from Sputnik I within days of its launch, an unplanned demonstration that marked the beginning of Lincoln's long involvement in space surveillance. The operational BMEWS network, with sites in Alaska, Greenland, and England, was completed in 1964 using components and specifications developed at the laboratory.

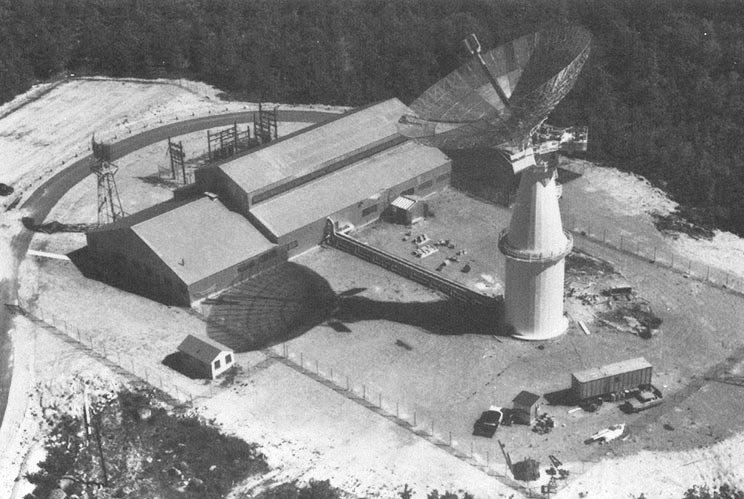
Millstone Hill UHF radar

Lincoln also built the Haystack long-range imaging radar at the Millstone Hill complex. Designed for space communications and radar research, Haystack became operational in 1964. Between 1958 and 1969, Lincoln scientists used these facilities to map the Moon, measure planetary orbits, refine the size of the solar system, verify a prediction of general relativity, and identify a molecule in interstellar space for the first time. The laboratory contributed to U.S. satellite communications through the Lincoln Experimental Satellites (LES), a series launched between 1965 and 1976 that demonstrated technologies including jam-resistant waveforms and satellite-to-satellite links.

By the late 1960s, Lincoln had established the research program that would persist in later decades: it specialized in sensor technology, signal processing, and system prototyping, designing and testing advanced systems and transferring designs to industry for production. Its primary areas of work—missile warning, space surveillance, high-performance radar, satellite communications, and solid-state electronics—all grew from capabilities developed during the SAGE era. The laboratory had also become a significant force in ballistic missile defense research, designing and deploying radar and optical systems on the Pacific missile testing range at Kwajalein Atoll.

==== Project West Ford ====
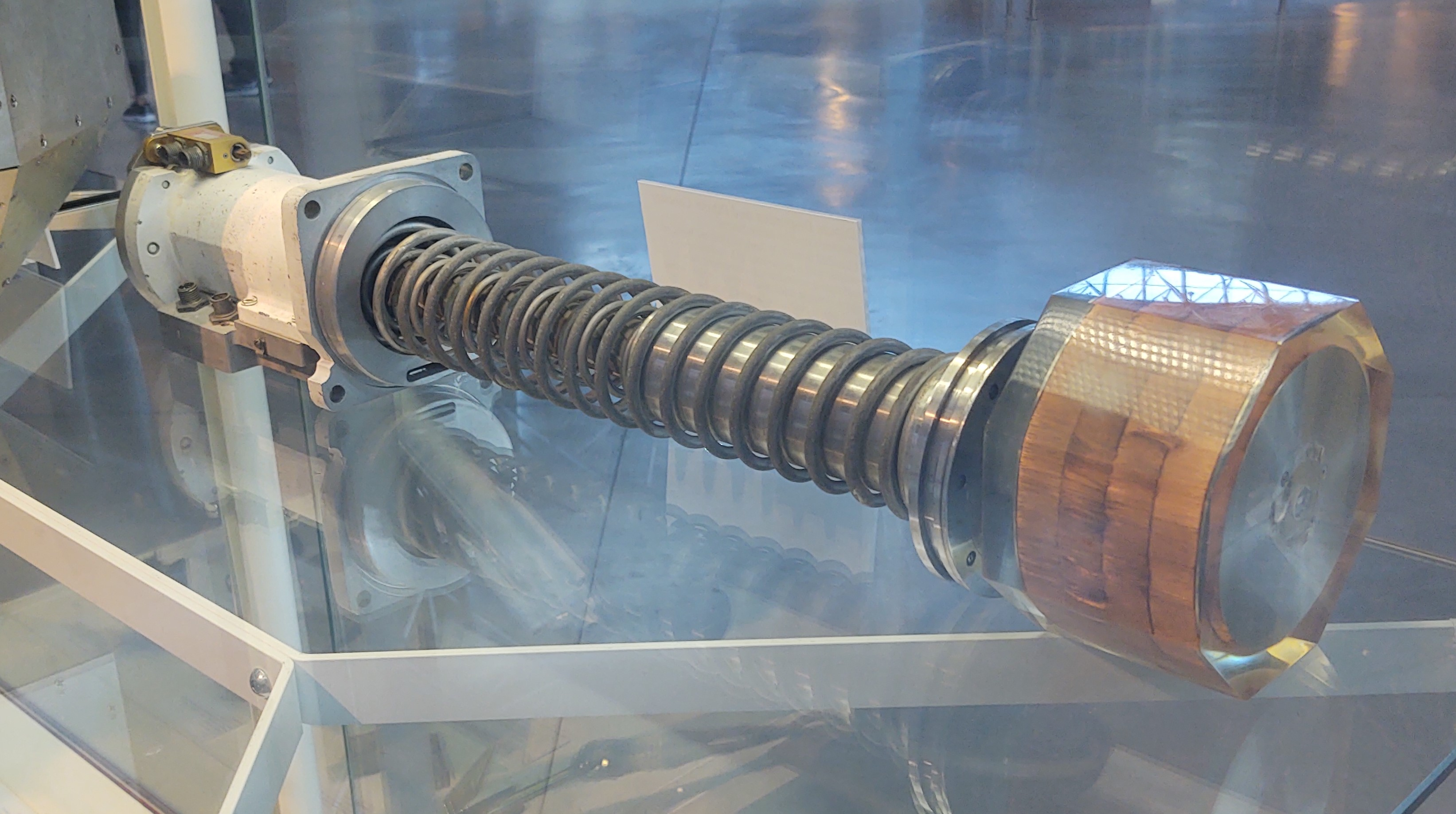
Dipole dispenser for Project West Ford

One of Lincoln's more unusual and controversial programs was Project West Ford (1958–1963), an experiment to create an artificial belt of orbiting copper dipoles that would scatter radio signals for transcontinental military communications, providing an alternative to the ionosphere in the event it was disrupted by nuclear detonations. The project drew criticism from radio and optical astronomers worldwide who feared it would interfere with scientific observations and set a precedent for further space debris. Critics included astronomers on both sides of the Iron Curtain.

After a failed first launch in 1961, a second attempt in May 1963 successfully deployed approximately 480 million hair-thin copper wires into polar orbit. The belt enabled communications at up to 20,000 bits per second between terminals in Westford, Massachusetts, and Camp Parks, California. As designed, solar radiation pressure caused the dipoles' orbits to decay; by early 1966 the belt had largely dispersed. The experiment demonstrated feasibility but was overtaken by active communications satellites such as Telstar, and the concept was not pursued operationally.

=== The Vietnam-era review ===
During the late 1960s, MIT's two off-campus "special laboratories" came under pressure from faculty and students opposed to the university's involvement in military research. By fiscal year 1968, MIT held $119 million in military research contracts, ranking first among university defense contractors. The primary target was the Instrumentation Laboratory, located near campus and responsible for missile guidance work on the Poseidon program. Lincoln, physically remote and oriented toward research and prototyping rather than weapons production, drew less direct attention.

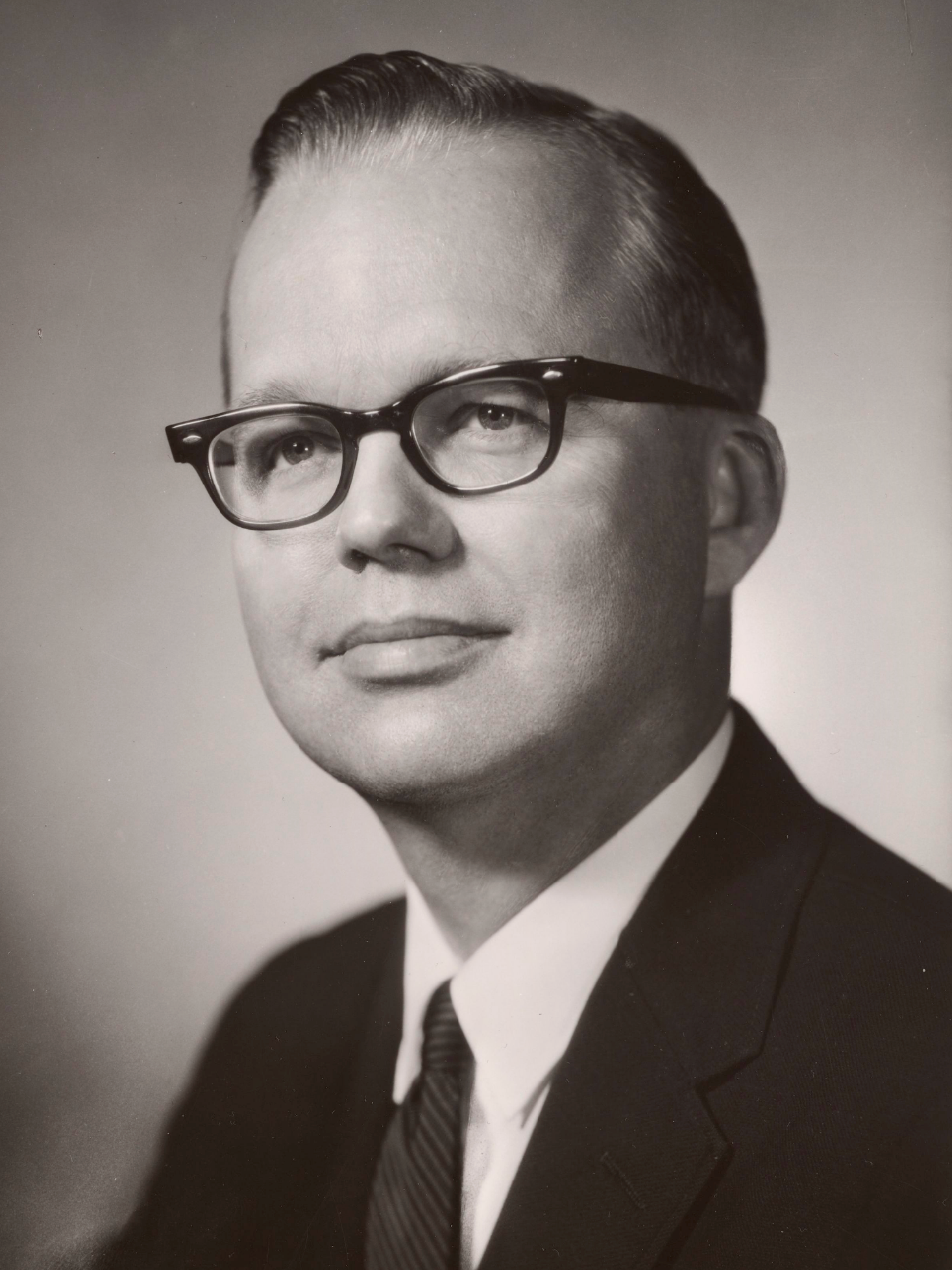
MIT president Howard Johnson initiated a review of defense contracts.

In April 1969, MIT president Howard W. Johnson convened the Review Panel on Special Laboratories (the Pounds Panel), which over twenty meetings heard from more than a hundred people. Its report recommended diversifying research, reducing classified work, strengthening campus collaboration, and establishing an oversight committee. Only two members called for divestiture, warning that the laboratories were "changing the character of the Institute." In May 1970, Johnson announced that the Instrumentation Laboratory would be divested; it became the independent Draper Laboratory in July 1973.

Lincoln experienced more modest changes. Its distance from Cambridge had shielded it from the confrontations that the Instrumentation Laboratory experienced. Johnson's October 1969 statement that the laboratories would "not assume responsibility for developing operational weapons systems" effectively described what Lincoln was already doing. The Pounds Panel's reforms—an oversight committee, diversification mandate, and enhanced reporting requirements—established a more formal governance framework that persisted in subsequent decades.

As many had predicted, divestiture strengthened rather than weakened the Draper Laboratory's dependence on defense contracts. Lincoln's own research portfolio tilted further toward military applications in the years that followed; a 1986 internal study committee noted that the laboratory's opportunities "overwhelmingly have military applications as an end-goal." As Harvard dean Harvey Brooks observed in reviewing the episode, the outcome left national research priorities largely unaffected.

=== The Strategic Defense Initiative and the end of the Cold War (1980s–1990s) ===
Through the 1980s, Lincoln's defense work expanded with the Strategic Defense Initiative (SDI), for which it developed sensor, tracking, and directed-energy technologies. The laboratory's missile defense testing at Kwajalein Atoll, where it had maintained a field site since the 1960s, grew substantially; by the mid-1980s roughly a quarter of Lincoln's budget came from SDI. The campus affiliations continued largely as before: in 1985, twenty-six MIT graduate students were doing thesis research at Lincoln, twenty-three faculty members served as consultants, and three Lincoln staff taught on campus, numbers comparable to two decades earlier.

The end of the Cold War reduced defense spending and eliminated several of Lincoln's programs, including much of its work on high-energy laser beams. The laboratory's core mission areas in air and missile defense, space surveillance, satellite communications, and advanced electronics continued, but two developments reshaped its portfolio: the growth of civilian work for the Federal Aviation Administration, and the expansion into homeland protection and cybersecurity after the September 11 attacks.

== Research programs ==
Lincoln Laboratory's work has centered on sensor technology, signal processing, and system prototyping for defense applications, but several programs have had substantial impact beyond the military sphere.

=== Air and missile defense ===
The laboratory's principal defense work after the Cold War continued in missile defense, space surveillance, and air defense, the areas established during the SAGE and BMEWS era. Lincoln remained the technical leader for the instrumentation radars at the Reagan Test Site on Kwajalein and for the deep-space tracking radars at Westford, providing test data and discrimination research for successive generations of missile defense programs.

In air defense, the laboratory shifted from designing systems to evaluating the survivability of U.S. aircraft against foreign air defenses, a program begun in 1977 that expanded into prototyping advanced air defense systems for the Navy and Air Force.

=== Air traffic control ===
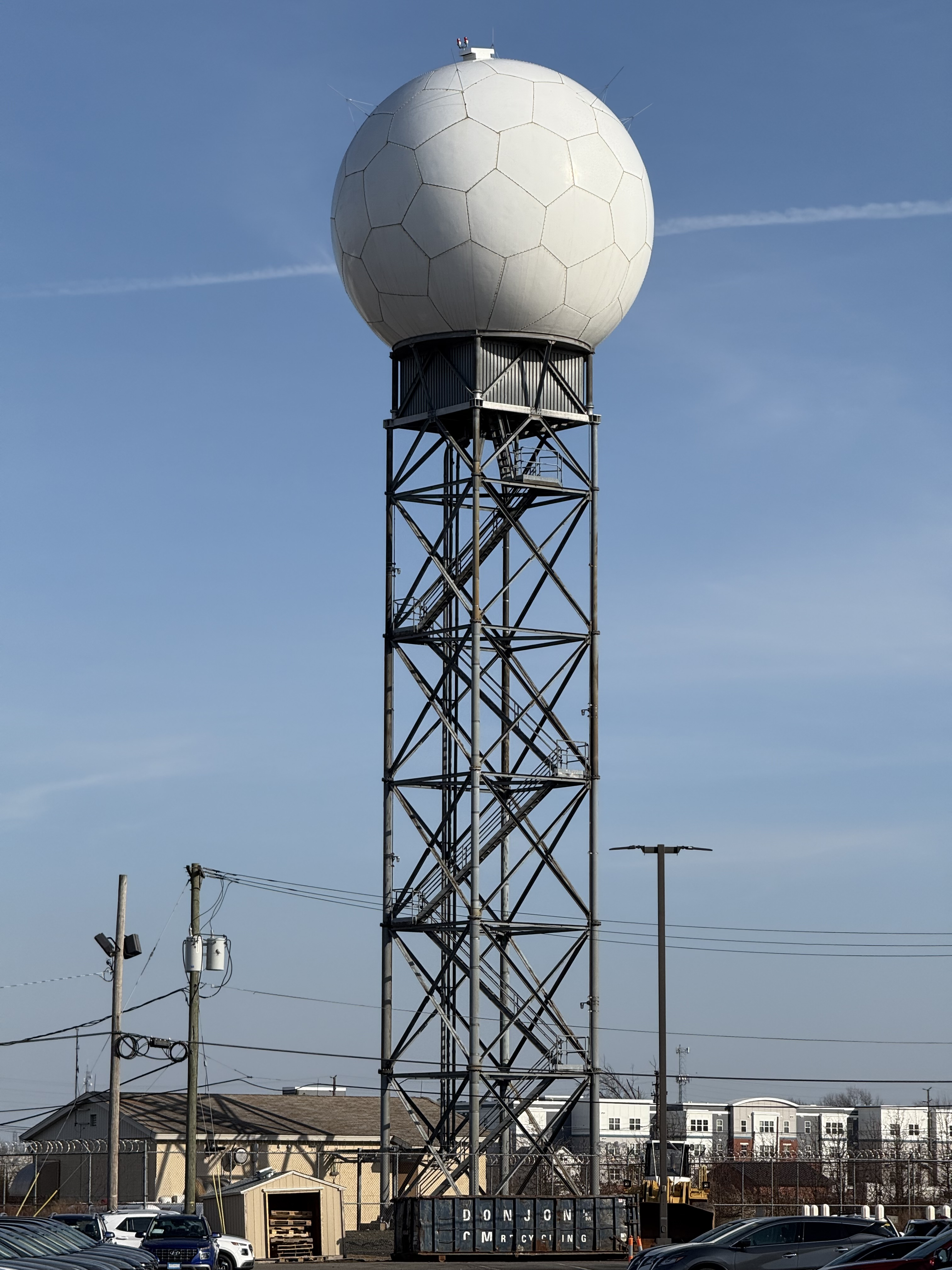
Terminal Dopplar Weather Radar in New Jersey

The FAA relationship became the laboratory's largest non-DoD program. Lincoln designed the Mode S secondary surveillance radar, which entered service in the 1980s as a replacement for the aging Air Traffic Control Radar Beacon System. The laboratory also developed the surveillance technology for the Traffic Alert and Collision Avoidance System (TCAS), now mandated on all large transport aircraft worldwide, and the Terminal Doppler Weather Radar (TDWR), a network of 47 airport weather radars deployed after a series of wind shear accidents in the 1980s and early 1990s. There has not been a major U.S. wind-shear-related air traffic accident since 1994.

Lincoln developed the Runway Status Lights system, which uses fused surveillance data to illuminate red in-pavement lights warning pilots and vehicle operators when a runway is occupied; the system has been deployed at major U.S. airports. The laboratory contributed to the development of Automatic Dependent Surveillance–Broadcast (ADS-B) and received the Robert J. Collier Trophy in 2007 as part of the ADS-B development team.

=== Computing and information theory ===
In 1960, staff members Irving S. Reed and Gustave Solomon published a method for constructing error-correcting codes that became known as Reed–Solomon codes. Their approach, which operated on groups of bits rather than individual digits, proved exceptionally effective at correcting burst errors. Practical decoding algorithms were not developed until the late 1960s, but Reed–Solomon codes eventually became standard in applications from compact discs to deep-space probes.

In 1963, Ivan Sutherland's Sketchpad system, developed on the TX-2 computer at Lincoln, became the first graphical computer interface, a foundational contribution to computer-aided design.

=== Semiconductor lasers and solid-state physics ===
Lincoln's Solid State Division pursued gallium arsenide (GaAs) technology from 1958, an unusual choice at a time when most laboratories focused on silicon. In 1962, Robert Keyes and Theodore Quist reported GaAs diode luminescence efficiencies of 85 percent, a result so striking it prompted a race among four laboratories: within a single month, groups at General Electric, IBM, Lincoln, and Nick Holonyak at GE Syracuse independently produced semiconductor diode lasers. In subsequent decades, Lincoln researchers extended diode laser technology across a range of wavelengths and materials, including the InGaAsP/InP system demonstrated in 1976 that became the basis for fiber-optic telecommunications transmitters.

The titanium-sapphire laser, first demonstrated at Lincoln in the early 1980s, achieved the widest amplification bandwidth of any laser and found applications in spectroscopy, medicine, and other fields.

=== Space surveillance and near-Earth objects ===
Building on its radar origins, Lincoln has operated a network of space surveillance sensors, including the Millstone and Haystack radars in Westford, Massachusetts, and optical telescopes at its White Sands, New Mexico, field site. The Lincoln Near-Earth Asteroid Research (LINEAR) program, which began routine operations in 1998, applied space surveillance telescope technology developed for the Air Force to the detection of near-Earth objects for NASA. Operating from the laboratory's White Sands Missile Range site, LINEAR discovered more near-Earth asteroids than any other survey program and, as of 2020, is credited by the Minor Planet Center with the discovery of 149,793 minor planets.

=== Biotechnology and biological defense ===
After 2001, the laboratory applied sensor and signal-processing capabilities developed for military systems to new problems in homeland security. The Department of Homeland Security funded programs in air defense of the National Capital Region, chemical and biological agent detection, and border security. The laboratory's biological-agent warning sensor, which uses laser-induced fluorescence to detect aerosolized particles, was incorporated into the military's Joint Biological Point Detection System. Subsequent work has expanded into broader biodefense and biomedical research.

=== Laser communications ===
In 2013, a laser communications terminal built by Lincoln Laboratory aboard NASA's Lunar Atmosphere and Dust Environment Explorer transmitted data between the Moon and Earth at 622 megabits per second, a record for space optical communication, demonstrating technology intended for future deep-space communications.

== Technology transfer and Route 128 ==
Lincoln Laboratory's defense programs generated extensive spillovers into the commercial economy, particularly along the Route 128 technology corridor west of Boston. The SAGE program alone cost billions of dollars to deploy, and even the ballistic missile defense effort, which never produced a working system, generated roughly a billion dollars in production contracts. That scale of spending attracted industrial interest in the laboratory's work.

Lincoln's most prominent spinoff was Digital Equipment Corporation (DEC). Kenneth Olsen and Harlan Anderson, both Lincoln staff members, founded DEC in 1957 to manufacture transistorized computers for engineers, drawing directly on the TX-0, a high-speed transistorized computer they had been developing at the laboratory. Backed by $70,000 in seed capital from American Research and Development Corporation, Olsen started the company in a former woolen mill in Maynard, Massachusetts; within a decade DEC had become the world's second-largest computer manufacturer after IBM. The MITRE Corporation, established in 1958 to take over SAGE system engineering, was itself a major institutional spinoff that by the 2010s operated two FFRDCs and employed more than 7,000 people.

Beyond these large organizations, Lincoln spun off dozens of smaller firms over the following decades. Leslie found that the laboratory had "even more impact on the local electronics industry than RLE," and that spinoff companies clustered around Lincoln's specialties in digital computers, systems analysis, and radar. Their founders typically maintained contacts with former colleagues, and the companies that fared best were those that stayed closest to those specialties. Technology transfer also took formal paths after the Bayh–Dole Act of 1980: by 2010, MIT held 945 patents derived from Lincoln Laboratory work, of which 548 had been licensed to industry. The laboratory's role in seeding the Massachusetts electronics industry, which Ridenour had predicted to Killian in 1951, became one of its most lasting effects.

== Organization and governance ==
=== Federal status ===
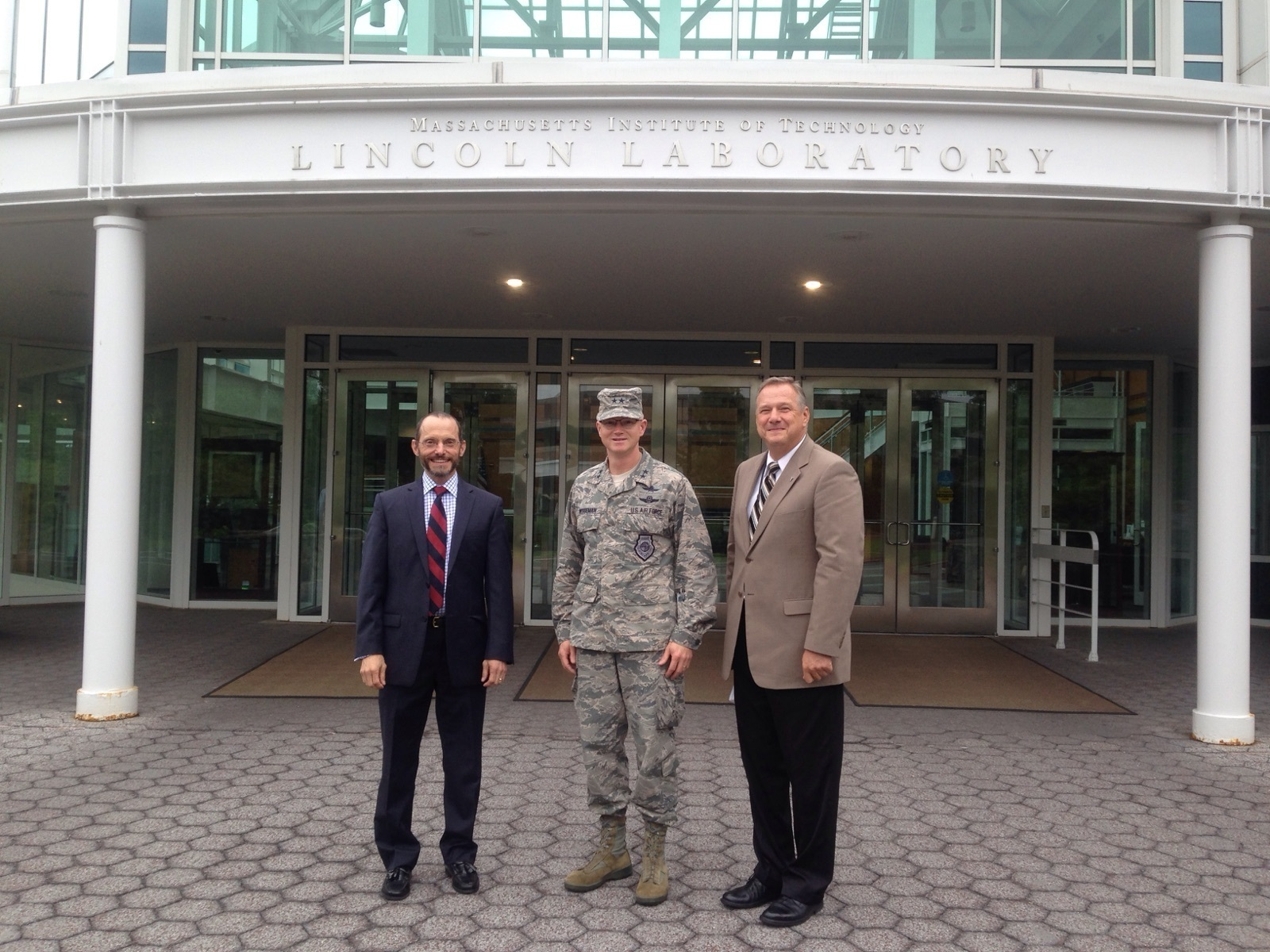
The laboratory hosts briefings for Air Force and Space Force officers.

Lincoln Laboratory is one of 42 federally funded research and development centers (FFRDCs) recognized by the federal government, and one of a smaller number managed by universities. FFRDCs are established to meet long-term research or development needs that cannot be satisfied by government or commercial organizations alone; in return, they receive stable institutional funding and access to sensitive information, but are subject to federal oversight and restrictions on competition with the private sector. Congress has imposed ceilings on the staff years of technical effort that Department of Defense FFRDCs may use, a constraint that the laboratory has said compels selectivity in taking on new work and emphasis on technology transfer rather than production.

Unlike defense contractors, Lincoln does not compete for production contracts; its role is to develop prototypes, conduct testing, and provide independent technical assessments. This distinction has defined the laboratory since the post-SAGE era, when Overhage deliberately steered Lincoln away from systems engineering and toward a research-and-prototype model.

=== Governance and administration ===
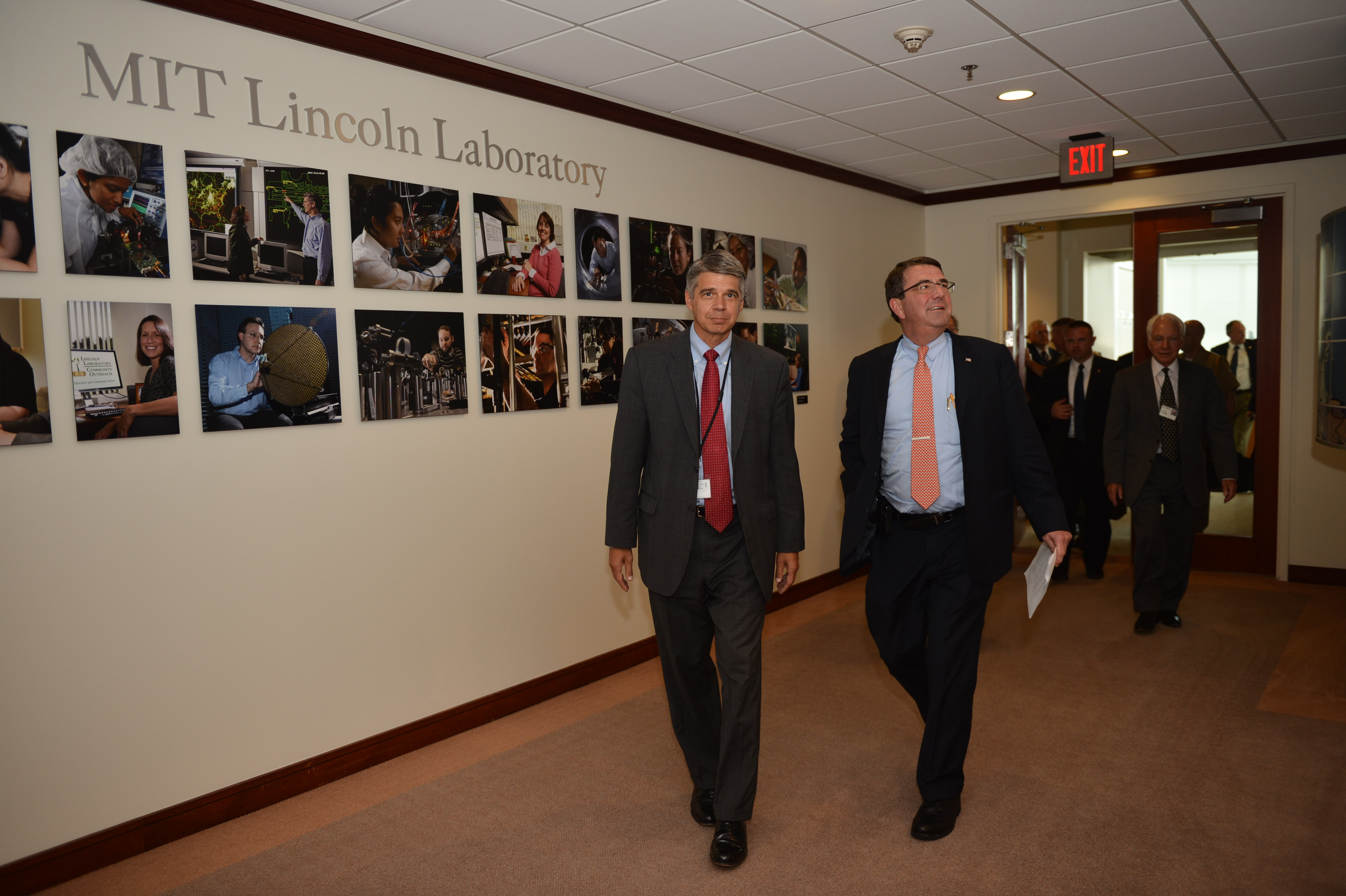
Deputy Defense Secretary Ash Carter visiting Lincoln Laboratory (2013)

MIT manages the laboratory without a fee and has done so since its founding. The laboratory director reports to the MIT provost, who is advised by a board of academic and industry leaders that functions similarly to a departmental visiting committee. On the government side, all programs must be approved by the Department of Defense Joint Advisory Committee (JAC), chaired by the Under Secretary of Defense for Research and Engineering. The JAC reviews the laboratory's annual program plan and ensures compliance with federal FFRDC policies.

Internally, the laboratory has maintained a flat organizational structure since its founding, with three management levels: the director's office, division heads, and group leaders. A typical technical group contains twenty to twenty-five staff members, and management has been drawn almost entirely from within. About two-thirds of the professional technical staff hold advanced degrees, and roughly 40 percent hold doctorates. As of fiscal year 2024, approximately 4,500 MIT employees and 475 subcontracted personnel worked at the laboratory, with about 90 percent of its funding coming from the Department of Defense.

=== Relationship with MIT ===
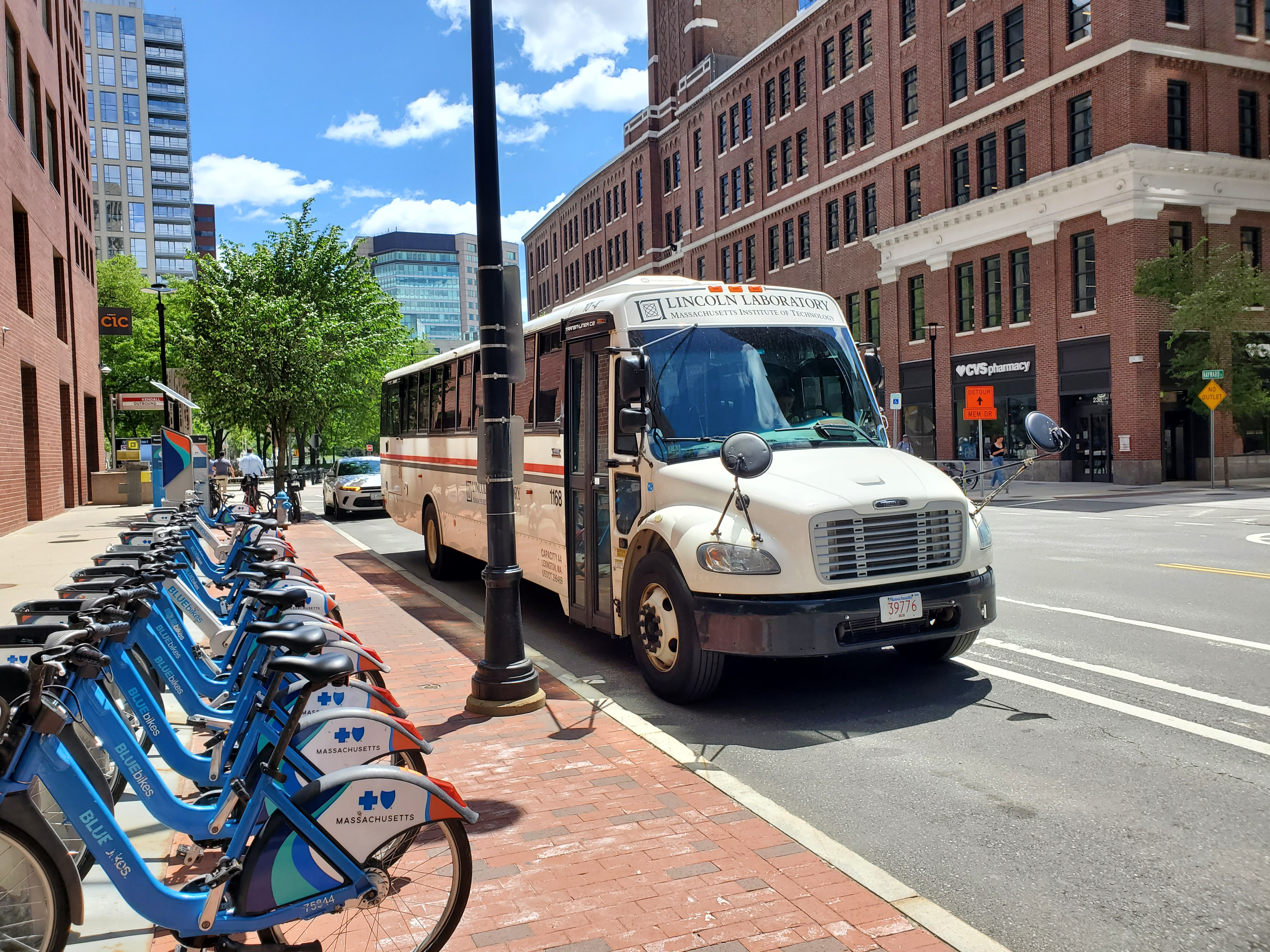
Laboratory shuttle at the MIT campus

The laboratory was twenty miles from campus and conducts mostly classified work that cannot take place on campus. In 1952, MIT created a Division of Defense Laboratories in 1952 to oversee Lincoln, acknowledging the difficulty of integrating a large classified research enterprise with the rest of the institute. During Lincoln's first decade, the Whirlwind project alone supported twenty-seven electrical engineering research assistants in a single semester. By the end of the 1960s, Lincoln had forty MIT faculty consultants, thirty-one staff members teaching on campus, and twenty-four staff supervising MIT theses.

Lincoln employees are not MIT faculty; however, some staff members hold departmental appointments at MIT and commuted to Cambridge to teach courses. Classified work cannot be conducted on the Cambridge campus and student participation has consistently remained a small fraction of the laboratory's workforce. At times, campus researchers have borrowed specialized Lincoln equipment for lunar radar experiments and interplanetary plasma probes.

In 1969, the Lincoln Laboratory budget stood at $66.8 million, higher than all of MIT's on-campus research spending combined ($58.8 million). Lincoln and the Instrumentation Laboratory together accounted for 51 percent of MIT's total budget of $217.5 million; only 27 percent of on-campus research funding came from the Department of Defense, and none was classified. This asymmetry between budgetary scale and academic integration has been a recurring topic in discussions of MIT's defense relationships.

=== Directors ===
No.	Image	Name	Term	Notes
1		F. Wheeler Loomis	July 26, 1951 – July 9, 1952	
2		Albert G. Hill	July 9, 1952 – May 5, 1955	
3		Marshall G. Holloway	May 5, 1955 – February 1, 1957	
4		Carl F. J. Overhage	February 1, 1957 – February 1, 1964	
5		William H. Radford	February 1, 1964 – May 9, 1966	
–		C. Robert Wieser, acting director	May 10, 1966 – January 1, 1967	
6		Milton U. Clauser	January 1, 1967 – June 1, 1970	
7		Gerald P. Dinneen	June 1, 1970 – April 1, 1977	
8		Walter E. Morrow Jr.	April 1, 1977 – June 30, 1998	
9		David L. Briggs	July 1, 1998 – June 30, 2006	
10		Eric D. Evans	July 1, 2006 – June 30, 2024	
11		Melissa G. Choi	July 1, 2024 – present	

== Field sites ==
Beyond its main campus at Hanscom Air Force Base in Lexington, Massachusetts, the laboratory operates three principal field sites. Each originated in a specific Cold War mission and has since taken on additional roles.

=== Lincoln Space Surveillance Complex ===
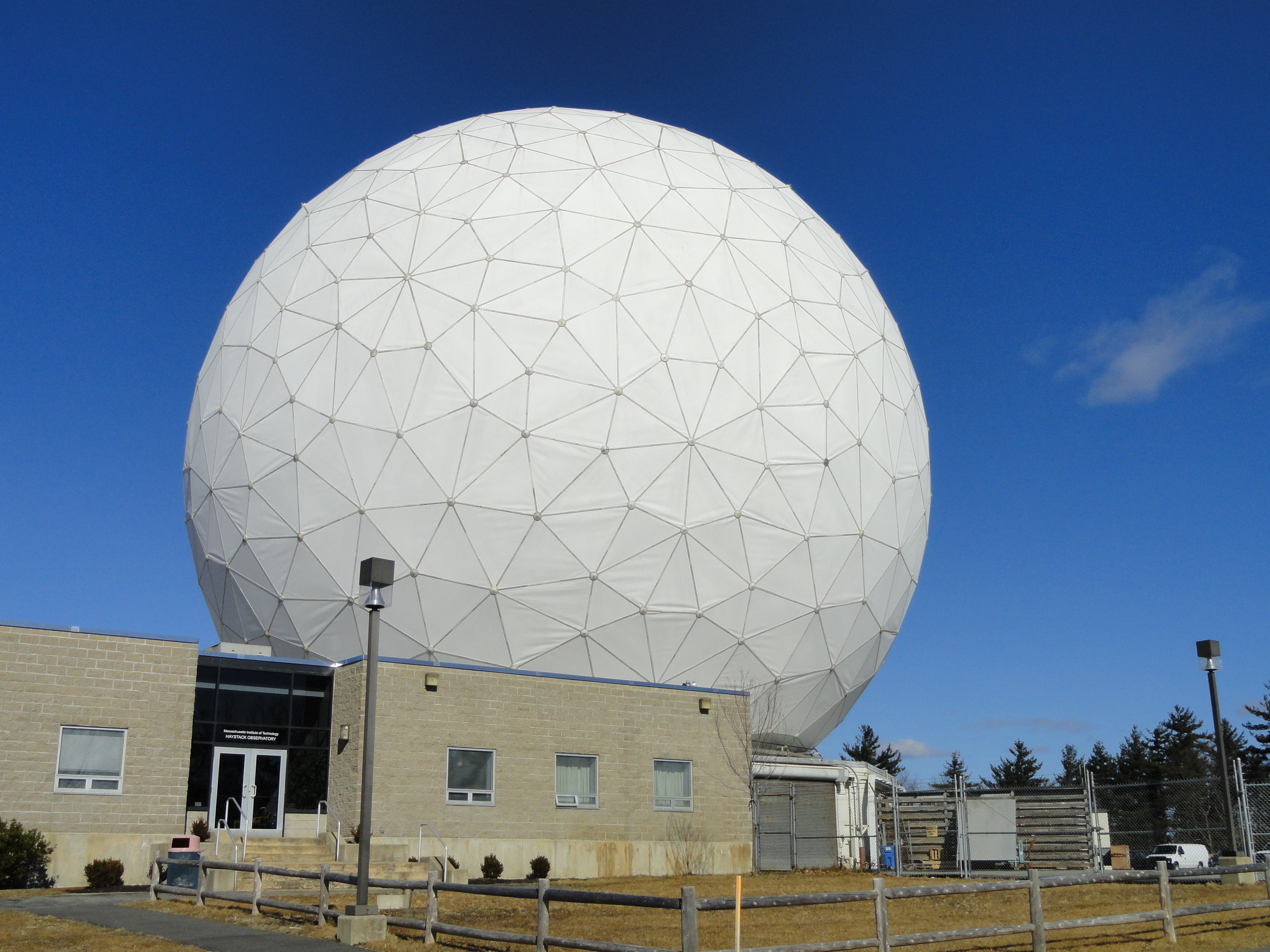
Long-Range Imaging Radar at Haystack Observatory

The Lincoln Space Surveillance Complex in Westford, Massachusetts, grew out of the laboratory's early work on ballistic missile warning. The Millstone Hill L-band radar, originally built as a prototype for the Ballistic Missile Early Warning System, detected radar returns from Sputnik 1 within days of its October 1957 launch and has tracked satellites continuously since.

The Haystack long-range imaging radar, operational since 1964, was designed as an experimental facility for space communications and radar research. Its 120-foot antenna, enclosed in what was then the world's largest space-frame radome, served for a decade as the laboratory's primary instrument for planetary radar astronomy before shifting to satellite imaging in the late 1970s. A third radar, the Haystack Auxiliary (HAX), was completed in 1993 under an agreement with NASA to collect data on space debris threatening the International Space Station. All three radars are designated contributing sensors to the U.S. Space Surveillance Network.

=== Reagan Test Site, Kwajalein Atoll ===
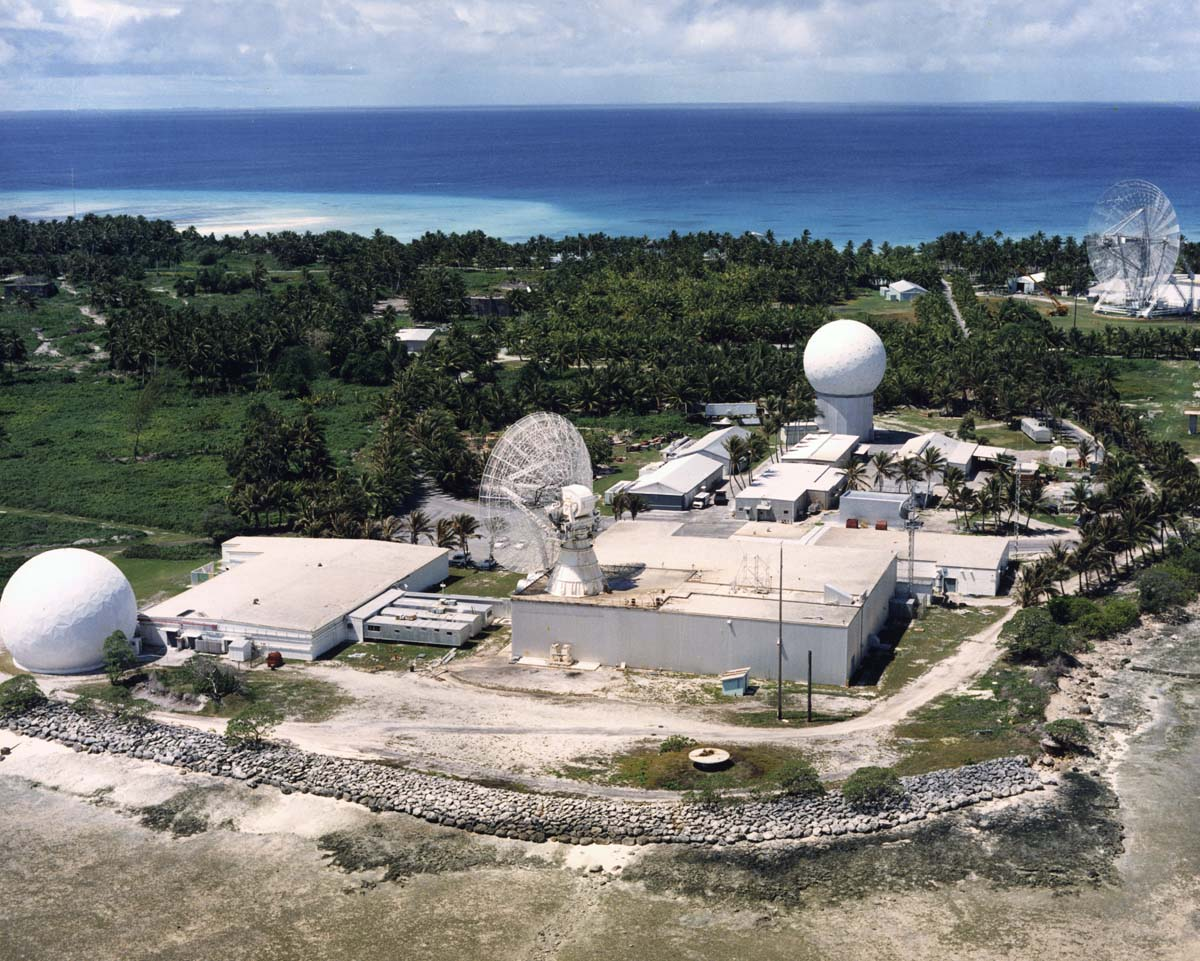
Kwajalein Atoll facility

Lincoln Laboratory has maintained a continuous presence on Kwajalein Atoll in the Marshall Islands since 1962, when the first instrumentation radar on the island of Roi-Namur became operational. The Advanced Research Projects Agency chose the atoll as the site for Project PRESS (Pacific Range Electromagnetic Signature Studies) because it lay 7,000 kilometers downrange from Vandenberg Air Force Base, making it a natural target area for intercontinental ballistic missile flight tests.

The laboratory serves as scientific advisor to the Ronald Reagan Ballistic Missile Defense Test Site and has technical oversight of the Kiernan Reentry Measurements Site (KREMS), a suite of four high-power instrumentation radars on Roi-Namur that support missile defense testing, space surveillance, and scientific research. The KREMS radars, like the Westford complex, are contributing sensors to the Space Surveillance Network, and the site contributes more than 70,000 satellite tracks per year, many on deep-space objects that no other radar can reach. The atoll's equatorial location has also made it suitable for space launches; the existing missile-test infrastructure was first used to launch a satellite into orbit in 2000.

=== Experimental Test Site, White Sands ===
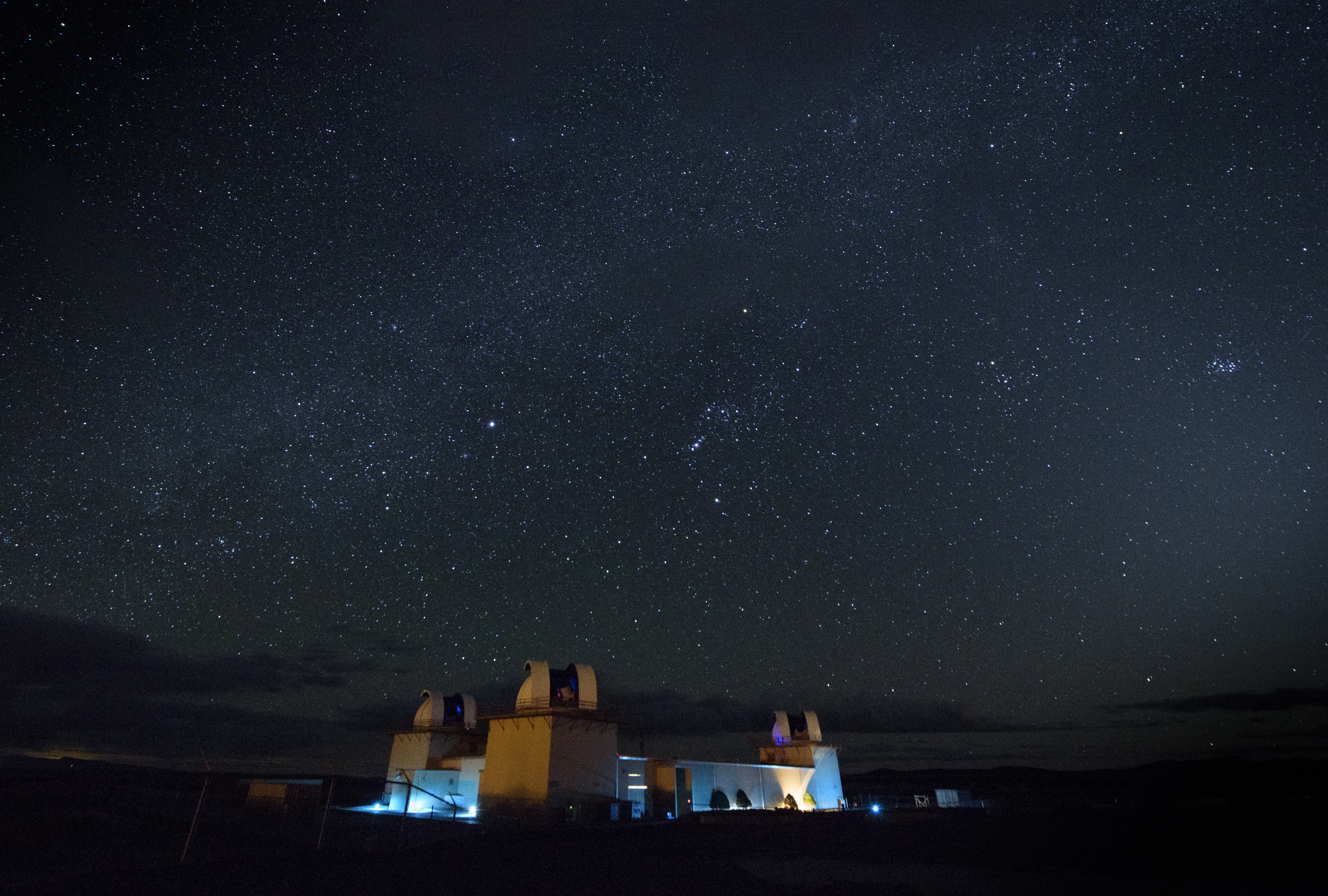
GEODSS array at White Sands

The Experimental Test Site (ETS; IAU observatory code: 704) is an electro-optical facility on the White Sands Missile Range near Socorro, New Mexico. It was established in 1975 to demonstrate the use of electro-optical sensors for deep-space surveillance, after Lincoln researchers showed that low-light-level television cameras on telescopes could detect satellites in the geosynchronous belt. The site's ground-based electro-optical deep-space surveillance (GEODSS) telescopes, equipped with Lincoln-developed charge-coupled device detectors, were later adapted for the Lincoln Near-Earth Asteroid Research (LINEAR) program, which used them to discover more minor planets than any other survey in history. The ETS has also hosted laser communications experiments, including the ground terminal for the 2013 Lunar Laser Communication Demonstration.
