= Gordon S. Brown =

American electrical engineer (1907–1996)

Gordon Stanley Brown
- Born: August 30, 1907; Drummoyne, New South Wales
- Died: August 23, 1996 (aged 88); Tucson, Arizona
- Known for: Servomechanisms
- Scientific career
- Thesis: The cinema integraph, a machine for evaluating a parametric product integral (1938)
- Doctoral advisor: Harold L. Hazen
- Notable students: Jay Wright Forrester

Gordon Stanley Brown (August 30, 1907 in Australia – August 23, 1996 in Tucson, Arizona) was a professor of electrical engineering at the Massachusetts Institute of Technology (MIT). He originated many of the concepts behind automatic-feedback control systems and the numerical control of machine tools. From 1959 to 1968, he served as the dean of the MIT School of Engineering. With his former student Donald P. Campbell, he wrote Principles of Servomechanisms in 1948, which is still a standard reference in the field.

== Biography ==
=== Early life ===
Brown was born in 1907 in Australia. He graduated from the Workingman's College (now the Royal Melbourne Institute of Technology) at the age of 18 with diplomas in civil, electrical and mechanical engineering. In 1929, Brown entered MIT as a junior, and graduated with a degree in electrical engineering in 1931. Continuing his studies at the Institute, he earned a master's degree in 1934. Since 1931 Brown assisted Harold Hazen in constructing an electro-optical analog computer based on Norbert Wiener's "Cinema Integraph" concept. In 1933 Brown's servomechanisms were displayed at the Century of Progress World Fair. In 1938 Brown received his Ph.D. for the study and making of the practical "Cinema Integraph", under tutelage of Hazen.

=== MIT career ===
In 1938 Vannevar Bush left the MIT for the Carnegie Institute. Hazen became the head of Electrical Engineering Department; Brown joined the MIT faculty in 1939 as an assistant professor of electrical engineering and took over the course in control systems created by Bush a few years earlier. Brown's first class was a group of four Navy lieutenants, who later all became admirals. In the same year, Brown became a naturalized American citizen. After the outbreak of World War Two, publication of Brown's research was suppressed for wartime secrecy concerns. Hazen, now section head at the NDRC, compensated Brown with his own laboratory at the MIT, – the Servomechanisms Laboratory, now known as the MIT Laboratory for Information and Decision Systems. The laboratory did pioneering research into control systems for machines, which led to the automatic fire-control and aiming systems used during the Second World War. Brown and his staff was also involved in the development of Whirlwind, the first all-digital computer.

Brown was promoted to full professor in 1946 and served as the chairman of the MIT faculty from 1951 to 1952. In 1952, he became the chairman of the electrical engineering department and from 1959 to 1968, he served as the dean of the school of engineering. In 1973, Brown received the distinction of Institute Professor, MIT's highest academic honor.

=== Retirement ===
Brown retired in 1974 as an emeritus professor of electrical engineering and Institute Professor Emeritus. He and his wife moved to Arizona, where he became involved with introducing computers and the ideas of system dynamics into classrooms.

In 1985, the building on MIT's campus housing the Microsystems Technology Laboratories was named the Gordon Stanley Brown Building (Building 39).

== Publications ==
- —; Campbell, Donald P. (1948). Principles of Servomechanisms. Dynamics and Synthesis of Closed-loop Control Systems. New York: Wiley. OCLC 563100.
