= Judy Clapp =

American computer scientist (born 1930)

- Born: Judith A. Clapp; 1930 (age 95–96); Long Island, New York
- Scientific career
- Fields: Software engineering
- Institutions: MITRE Corporation

Judith A. Clapp (born 1930) is a computer scientist who began her career at the Massachusetts Institute of Technology (MIT) and subsequently moved to the Lincoln Laboratory and then to MITRE, where she was a leader in the Semi-Automatic Ground Environment (SAGE) military project, including the development of the SAGE computer.

== Early life and education ==
Clapp was born in 1930 and was raised in Long Island, New York. She received her bachelor's degree in math and physics in 1951 from Smith College and her master's degree in applied science (which she described as the closest match to computer science available at the time) in 1952 from Radcliffe College, then a women's affiliate of Harvard University.

== Career ==
After graduating from Radcliffe, Clapp began work at MIT, the only woman among the early programmers of the Whirlwind I, the first real-time computer. The Whirlwind, a vacuum tube computer, had originally been commissioned by the United States Navy but was subsequently financed by the Air Force for the Semi-Automatic Ground Environment (SAGE) project. Clapp continued to work on the project after its transfer to the Lincoln Laboratory and later to the MITRE Corporation, eventually becoming a Senior Principal Software Systems Engineer at MITRE. After the SAGE project Clapp continued to work in management at MITRE and participated in the Department of Defense Working Group that led to the development of the Ada programming language.

== Legacy ==
Clapp's work is regarded as important groundwork for the development of software engineering as a discipline. She was involved in early professional organizations for women in computing and is recognized as a pioneer among women in the field. Clapp received an Achievement Award from the Society of Women Engineers in 2001. In 2005, she received the Smith College Medal. Her work and thoughts on working on the SAGE project were also discussed in the book Recoding Gender: Women's Changing Participation in Computing.
