= Robert Everett (computer scientist) =

American computer scientist (1921–2018)

Robert Rivers Everett
- Born: June 26, 1921; Yonkers, New York, U.S.
- Died: August 15, 2018 (aged 97); Cape Cod, Massachusetts, U.S.
- Education: Duke University (B.S., 1942); MIT (M.S., 1943)
- Known for: MIT Whirlwind; SAGE computer systems
- Spouse: Ann T. Everett
- Awards: IEEE Fellow National Academy of Engineering Member; National Medal of Technology and Innovation (1989) Computer History Museum Fellow (2009)
- Scientific career
- Fields: Electrical engineering
- Workplaces: MITRE

Robert Rivers Everett (June 26, 1921 – August 15, 2018) was an American computer scientist. He was an honorary board member of the MITRE Corporation. He was born in Yonkers, New York.

In 1945 he worked with Jay Forrester on the Whirlwind project, one of the first real time electronic computers. In 1958 he was a founding member of the MITRE Corporation, and was its president from 1969 to 1986.

In 1983 he received the Medal for Distinguished Public Service from the Department of Defense and in 1989 he received the National Medal of Technology.

In 2009, he was named the winner of the 2008 Eugene G. Fubini Award for outstanding contributions to the Department of Defense (DoD). In 2009, he was also made a Fellow of the Computer History Museum "for his work on the MIT Whirlwind and SAGE computer systems and a lifetime of directing advanced research and development projects."

Business positions
Preceded by John L. McLucas	President of MITRE; 1969 – 1986	Succeeded by Charles A. Zraket
Government offices
Preceded by Charles A. "Bert" Fowler	Chairman of the Defense Science Board; 1988 – 1989	Succeeded by John S. Foster Jr.
