= Roger Sisson =

American computer scientist

- Born: June 24, 1926
- Died: January 22, 1992 (aged 65); New York City, United States
- Occupation: Computer scientist
- Known for: Data processing research

Roger Lee Sisson (June 24, 1926 - January 22, 1992) was an American data processing pioneer. He worked on Project Whirlwind as a graduate student at the Massachusetts Institute of Technology (MIT), co-founded one of the first consulting firms devoted exclusively to electronic data processing, and wrote several of the earliest books and periodicals on computing and data-processing management.

== Education and Project Whirlwind ==
Sisson earned his Master of Science in electrical engineering from MIT in January 1950. While a graduate student he worked in Jay Forrester's laboratory on Project Whirlwind, one of the first real-time digital computers. His master's thesis, written with Alfred Susskind, addressed digital-to-analog conversion for the machine's cathode-ray tube display.

== Consulting and publishing ==
With Richard Canning, Sisson founded Canning, Sisson and Associates, one of the first consulting firms devoted exclusively to electronic data processing. In 1955 Canning and Sisson also began publishing Data Processing Digest, one of the earliest periodicals covering the computing field. Sisson went on to write several books on the management of data processing, including The Management of Data Processing and A Manager's Guide to Data Processing.

== Operations research ==
Sisson contributed to the field of operations research, where his 1959 survey "Methods of Sequencing in Job Shops" in the journal Operations Research was an early and frequently cited review of job-shop sequencing methods.

== Death ==
Sisson died of sudden cardiac arrest in New York City on January 22, 1992, at the age of 65.
