= MIT Laboratory for Information and Decision Systems =

Laboratory at the Massachusetts Institute of Technology, MA, USA

The MIT Laboratory for Information and Decision Systems (LIDS) is an interdisciplinary research laboratory of MIT, working on research in the areas of communications, control, and signal processing combining faculty from the School of Engineering (including the Department of Aeronautics and Astronautics), the Department of Mathematics and the MIT Sloan School of Management. The lab is located in the Dreyfoos Tower of the Stata Center and shares some research duties with MIT's Lincoln Laboratory and the independent Draper Laboratory.

The laboratory was founded in 1940 as the Servomechanisms Laboratory (servo lab). At the time it was a center for research into automated control systems, including those used for automatic gun laying systems. This expertise led to work in the emerging radar field where the lab was instrumental in introducing automatic radar tracking systems used in the SCR-584 radar. In the post-war era the lab focused more on electronic systems as opposed to mechanical servos, including the use of computers, and this led to it becoming the Electronic Systems Laboratory (ESL) in 1959. This, in turn, led to the lab working on systems to collect information from widespread sensors and combine in, and presenting that information for command decisions. This led to the current name being adopted in 1978.

== History ==
The laboratory traces its beginnings to the MIT Servomechanisms Laboratory in 1940, where work on guidance systems and early computation was done during World War II.

Known as LIDS, the laboratory has hosted several luminaries over the years, including Claude Shannon and David Forney. As of July 2021, the current acting director is Prof. Sertac Karaman.

== See also ==
- Gordon S. Brown
