= Cape Cod System =

The Cape Cod System was a computer system designed to simulate an air defense system covering southern New England. It was named after Cape Cod, the location of many of the radars.

== History ==
The Cape Cod System was designed to demonstrate a computerized air defense system, covering southern New England. Signals from three long range (AN/FPS-3) radars, eleven gap-filler radars, and three height-finding radars were converted from analog to digital format and transmitted over telephone lines to the Whirlwind I computer in Cambridge, Massachusetts. The first tests of the Cape Cod System, beginning in September 1953, used only simulated data, but later tests used U.S. Air Force B-47 Stratojet bombers, as stand-ins for Soviet bombers, and real interceptors scrambled from four Air Force bases.

The Cape Cod System verified that the new core-based machine was fast enough for use in SAGE, and an industrial effort was started in order to mass-produce the AN/FSQ-7 computers for this role. RCA was a front-runner, but IBM was eventually selected instead. They started production in 1957, along with a massive construction project to erect the buildings, power and communications network needed to feed the SAGE systems with data.
