= Jay Wright Forrester =

American operations researcher

- Born: July 14, 1918; Anselmo, Nebraska, U.S.
- Died: November 16, 2016 (aged 98); Concord, Massachusetts, U.S.
- Education: University of Nebraska (BS); Massachusetts Institute of Technology (MS)
- Known for: MIT Whirlwind; Random-access memory; Forrester effect
- Awards: IEEE Medal of Honor (1972); Howard N. Potts Medal; National Medal of Technology and Innovation (1989); Computer History Museum Fellow (1995)
- Scientific career
- Institutions: MIT Sloan School of Management (1956)

Jay Wright Forrester (July 14, 1918 – November 16, 2016) was an American computer engineer, management theorist and systems scientist. He spent his entire career at Massachusetts Institute of Technology, entering as a graduate student in 1939, and eventually retiring in 1989.

During World War II Forrester worked on servomechanisms as a research assistant to Gordon S. Brown. After the war he headed MIT's Whirlwind project, one of the first digital computers. There he is credited as a co-inventor of magnetic core memory, the predominant form of random-access computer memory during the most explosive years of digital computer development (between 1955 and 1975). It was part of a family of related technologies which bridged the gap between vacuum tubes and semiconductors by exploiting the magnetic properties of materials to perform switching and amplification. His team is also believed to have created the first animation in the history of computer graphics, a "jumping ball" on an oscilloscope.

Later, Forrester was a professor at the MIT Sloan School of Management, where he introduced the Forrester effect describing fluctuations in supply chains. He has been credited as a founder of system dynamics, which deals with the simulation of interactions between objects in dynamic systems. After his initial efforts in industrial simulation, Forrester attempted to simulate urban dynamics and then world dynamics, developing a model with the Club of Rome along the lines of the model popularized in The Limits to Growth. Today system dynamics is most often applied to research and consulting in organizations and other social systems.

== Early life and education ==
Forrester was born on a farm near Anselmo, Nebraska, where "his early interest in electricity was spurred, perhaps, by the fact that the ranch had none. While in high school, he built a wind-driven, 12-volt electrical system using old car parts—it gave the ranch its first electric power."

Forrester received his Bachelor of Science in Electrical Engineering in 1939 from the University of Nebraska. He went on to graduate school at the Massachusetts Institute of Technology, where he worked with servomechanism pioneer Gordon S. Brown and gained his master's in 1945 with a thesis on 'Hydraulic Servomechanism Developments'. In 1949 he was inducted into Eta Kappa Nu the Electrical & Computer Engineering Honor Society.

== Career ==
=== Whirlwind projects ===
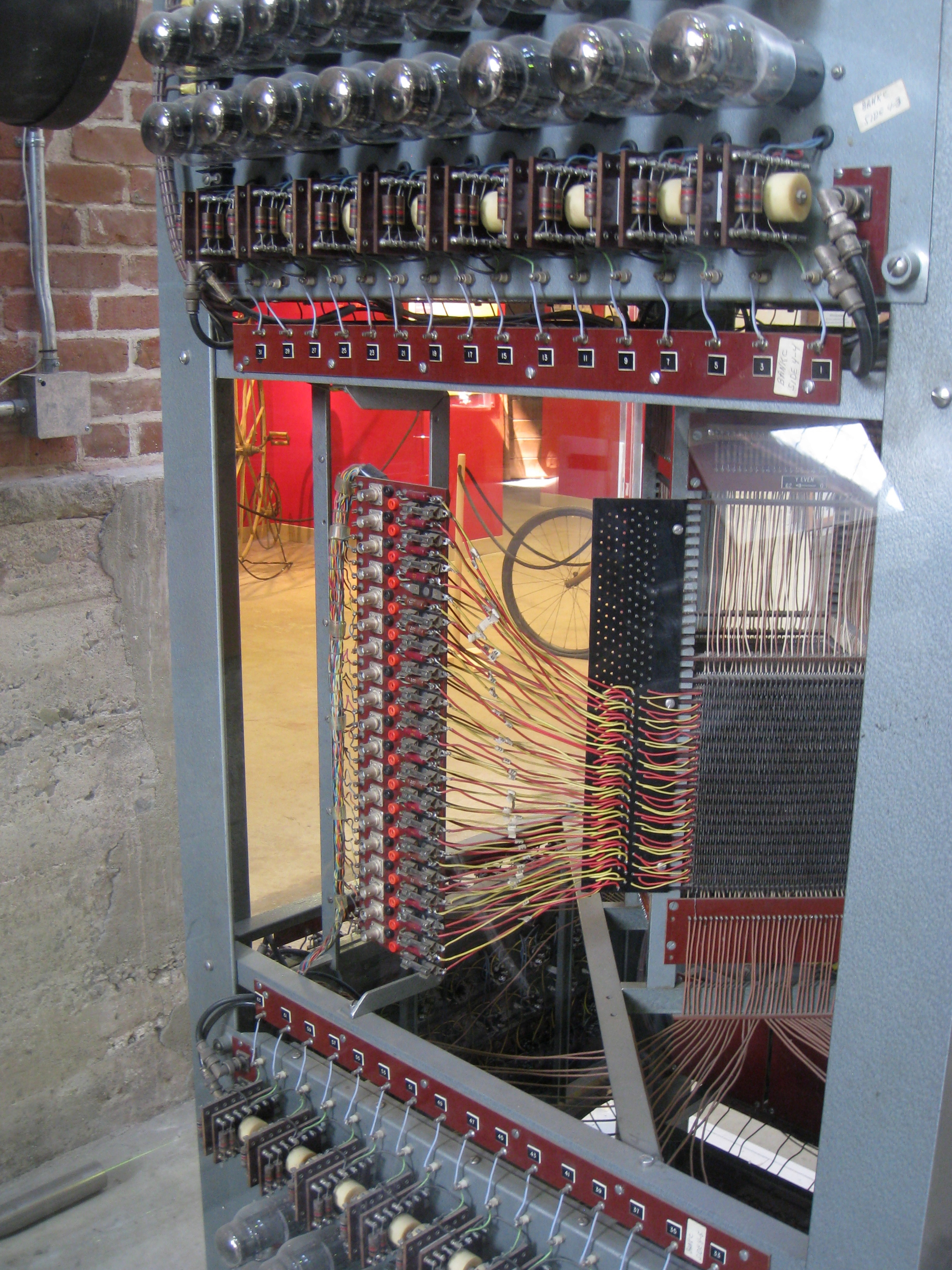
Project Whirlwind core memory, circa 1951

During the late 1940s and early 50s, Forrester continued research in electrical and computer engineering at MIT, heading the Whirlwind project. Trying to design an aircraft simulator, the group moved away from an initial analog design to develop a digital computer. As a key part of this design, Forrester perfected and patented multi-dimensional addressable magnetic-core memory, the forerunner of today's RAM. In 1948-49 the Whirlwind team created the first animation in the history of computer graphics, a "jumping ball" on an oscilloscope. Whirlwind began operation in 1951, the first digital computer to operate in real time and to use video displays for output. It subsequently evolved into the air defence system Semi-Automatic Ground Environment (SAGE).

=== DEC board member ===
Forrester was invited to join the board of Digital Equipment Corporation by Ken Olsen in 1957, and advised the early company on management science. He left before 1966 due to changes in DEC to a product line led organisation.

=== Forrester effect ===
In 1956, Forrester moved to the MIT Sloan School of Management as Germeshausen professor. After his retirement, he continued until 1989 as Professor Emeritus and Senior Lecturer. In 1961 he published his seminal book, Industrial Dynamics, the first work in the field of system dynamics. The work resulted from analyzing the operations of Sprague Electric in Massachusetts. The study was the first model of supply chains, showing in this case that inventory fluctuations were not due to external factors as thought, but rather to internal corporate dynamics that his continuous modelling approach could detect. The phenomenon, originally called the Forrester effect, is today more frequently described as the "bullwhip effect".

=== System dynamics ===
Forrester was the founder of system dynamics, which deals with the simulation of interactions between objects in dynamic systems. Industrial Dynamics was the first book Forrester wrote using system dynamics to analyze industrial business cycles. Several years later, interactions with former Boston Mayor John F. Collins led Forrester to write Urban Dynamics, which sparked an ongoing debate on the feasibility of modeling broader social problems. The book went on to influence the video game SimCity.

Forrester's 1971 paper 'Counterintuitive Behavior of Social Systems' argued that the use of computerized system models to inform social policy was superior to simple debate, both in generating insight into the root causes of problems and in understanding the likely effects of proposed solutions. He characterized normal debate and discussion as being dominated by inexact mental models:

The mental model is fuzzy. It is incomplete. It is imprecisely stated. Furthermore, within one individual, a mental model changes with time and even during the flow of a single conversation. The human mind assembles a few relationships to fit the context of a discussion. As the subject shifts so does the model. When only a single topic is being discussed, each participant in a conversation employs a different mental model to interpret the subject. Fundamental assumptions differ but are never brought into the open. Goals are different and are left unstated. It is little wonder that compromise takes so long. And it is not surprising that consensus leads to laws and programs that fail in their objectives or produce new difficulties greater than those that have been relieved.

The paper summarized the results of a previous study on the system dynamics governing the economies of urban centers, which showed "how industry, housing, and people interact with each other as a city grows and decays." The study's findings, presented more fully in Forrester's 1969 book Urban Dynamics, suggested that the root cause of depressed economic conditions was a shortage of job opportunities relative to the population level, and that the most popular solutions proposed at the time (e.g. increasing low-income housing availability, or reducing real estate taxes) counter-intuitively would worsen the situation by increasing this relative shortage. The paper further argued that measures to reduce the shortage—such as converting land use from housing to industry, or increasing real estate taxes to spur property redevelopment—would be similarly counter-effective.

=== Systems thinking ===
Systems thinking, a paradigm of profound interconnectedness, sprang from the pioneering efforts of theoretical biologist Ludwig von Bertalanffy, alongside the contributions of Jay Wright Forrester, a management theorist and systems scientist whose innovative vision shaped its core. Together with other scientists, their groundbreaking work laid the foundation for this transformative framework, which reached its apogee in the 1990s with the publication of Peter Senge’s seminal bestseller, The Fifth Discipline, illuminating its principles for a global audience.

=== Club of Rome ===
'Counterintuitive Behavior of Social Systems' also sketched a model of world dynamics that correlated population, food production, industrial development, pollution, availability of natural resources, and quality of life, and attempted future projections of those values under various assumptions. Forrester presented this model more fully in his 1971 book World Dynamics, notable for serving as the initial basis for the World3 model used by Donella and Dennis Meadows in their popular 1972 book The Limits to Growth.

Forrester met Aurelio Peccei, a founder of the Club of Rome in 1970. He later met with the Club of Rome to discuss issues surrounding global sustainability; the book World Dynamics followed. World Dynamics took on modeling the complex interactions of the world economy, population and ecology, which was controversial (see also Donella Meadows and The Limits to Growth). It was the start of the field of global modeling. Forrester continued working in applications of system dynamics and promoting its use in education.

== Awards ==
In 1972, Forrester received the IEEE Medal of Honor, IEEE's highest award. In 1982, he received the IEEE Computer Pioneer Award. In 1995, he was made a Fellow of the Computer History Museum "for his perfecting of core memory technology into a practical computer memory device; for fundamental contributions to early computer systems design and development". In 2006, he was inducted into the Operational Research Hall of Fame.

== Publications ==
Forrester wrote several books, including:

- Forrester, Jay W. (1961). Industrial Dynamics. M.I.T. Press.
- 1968. Principles of Systems, 2nd ed. Pegasus Communications.
- 1969. Urban Dynamics. Pegasus Communications.
- 1971. World Dynamics. Wright-Allen Press.
- 1975. Collected Papers of Jay W. Forrester. Pegasus Communications.

His articles and papers include:

- 1958. 'Industrial Dynamics – A Major Breakthrough for Decision Makers', Harvard Business Review, Vol. 36, No. 4, pp. 37–66.
- 1968, 'Market Growth as Influenced by Capital Investment', Industrial Management Review, Vol. IX, No. 2, Winter 1968.
- 1971, 'Counterintuitive Behavior of Social Systems', Theory and Decision, Vol. 2, December 1971, pp. 109–140. Also available online.
- 1989, 'The Beginning of System Dynamics'. Banquet Talk at the international meeting of the System Dynamics Society, Stuttgart, Germany, July 13, 1989. MIT System Dynamics Group Memo D.
- 1992, 'System Dynamics and Learner-Centered-Learning in Kindergarten through 12th Grade Education.'
- 1993, 'System Dynamics and the Lessons of 35 Years', in Kenyon B. Greene (ed.) A Systems-Based Approach to Policymaking, New York: Springer, pp. 199–240.
- 1996, 'System Dynamics and K–12 Teachers: a lecture at the University of Virginia School of Education'.
- 1998, 'Designing the Future'. Lecture at Universidad de Sevilla, December 15, 1998.
- 1999, 'System Dynamics: the Foundation Under Systems Thinking'. Cambridge, MA: Sloan School of Management.
- 2016, 'Learning through System Dynamics as preparation for the 21st Century', System Dynamics Review, Vol. 32, pp. 187–203.

== See also ==
- DYNAMO (programming language)
- Roger Sisson
