= Foodscaping =

Ornamental landscaping with edible plants

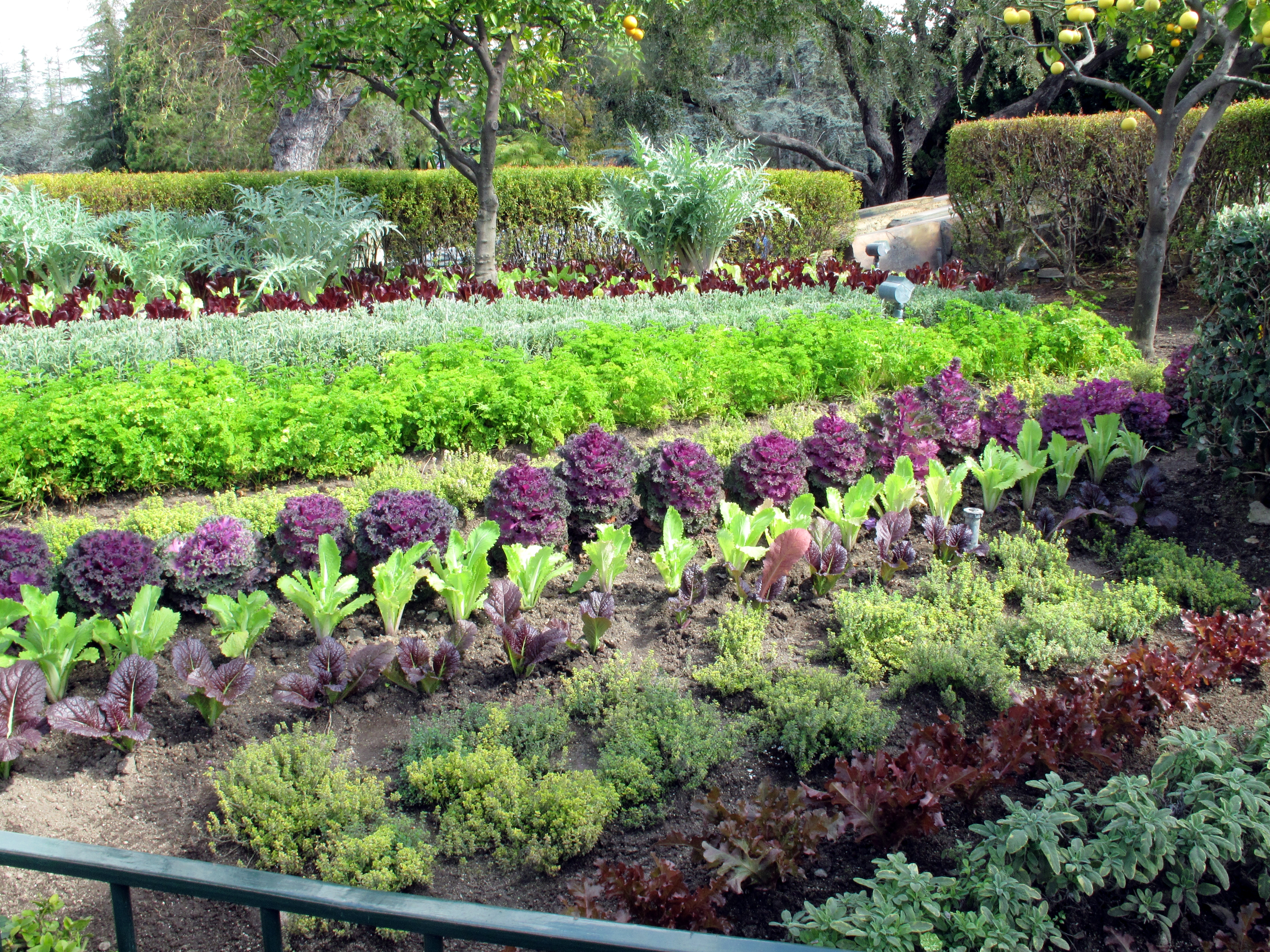
Edible landscape at Pixie Hollow Garden, Epcot, Walt Disney World in Florida featuring decorative green and purple kale and chard varieties.

Foodscaping is a modern term for integrating edible plants into ornamental landscapes. It is also referred to as edible landscaping and has been described as a crossbreed between landscaping and farming. As an ideology, foodscaping aims to show that edible plants are not only consumable but can also be appreciated for their aesthetic qualities. Foodscaping spaces are seen as multi-functional landscapes that are visually attractive and also provide edible returns. Foodscaping is a method of providing fresh food affordably and sustainably.

Differing from conventional vegetable gardening, where fruits and vegetables are typically grown in separate, enclosed areas, foodscaping incorporates edible plants as a major element of a pre-existing landscaping space. This may involve adding edible plantations to an existing ornamental garden or replacing traditional, non-edible plants with food-yielding species. The designs can incorporate various kinds of vegetables, fruit trees, berry bushes, edible flowers, herbs, and purely ornamental species. The design strategy of foodscaping has many benefits, including increasing food security, improving the growth of nutritious food, and promoting sustainable living. Edible landscaping practices may be implemented on both public and private premises. Foodscaping can be practiced by individuals, community groups, businesses, or educational institutions. There is a lot of misconceptions about what constitutes Foodscaping and it is often confused or equated with urban agriculture. However they are not to be confused as they have different purposes Urban Agriculture can happen anywhere parking lots, rooftops, and inside buildings. "Yet the purpose of Foodscaping is to grow edible plants in urban landscapes that are designed to be aesthetic and functional for the purpose of the community that is typically in parks, roadsides, or community gardens."

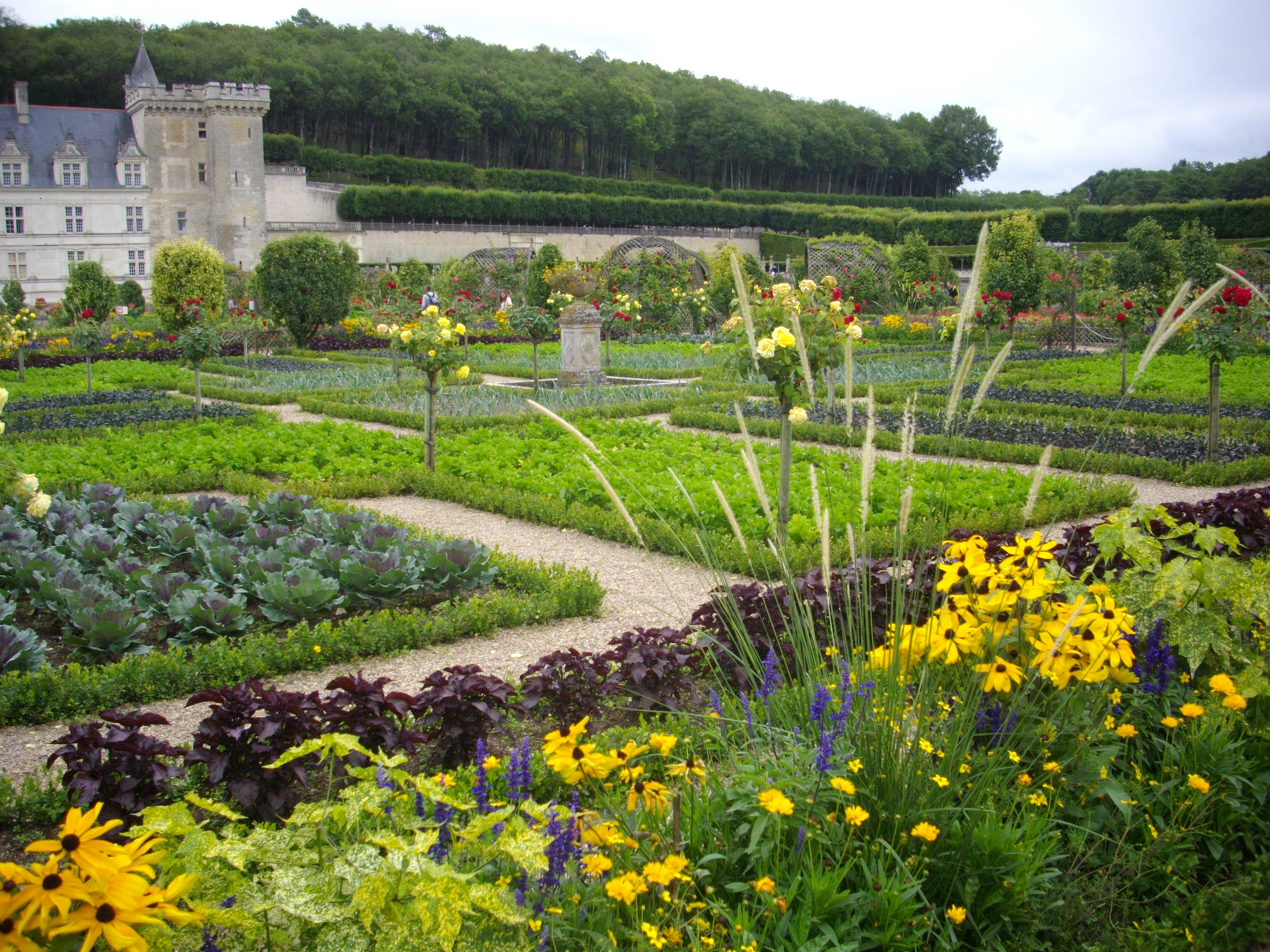
The Renaissance-style vegetable garden at Château de Villandry, France, displays rows of cabbage, carrots, and leeks among colorful flowers to create a productive and ornamental landscape.

Foodscaping is believed to have gained popularity in the 21st century for several reasons. Some accounts claim that the rise of foodscaping is due to the volatility of global food prices and the 2008 financial crisis. However, other accounts suggest that the spike in foodscaping popularity is linked to urbanization and increasing concerns for environmental sustainability.

== Origins ==
=== Overview ===
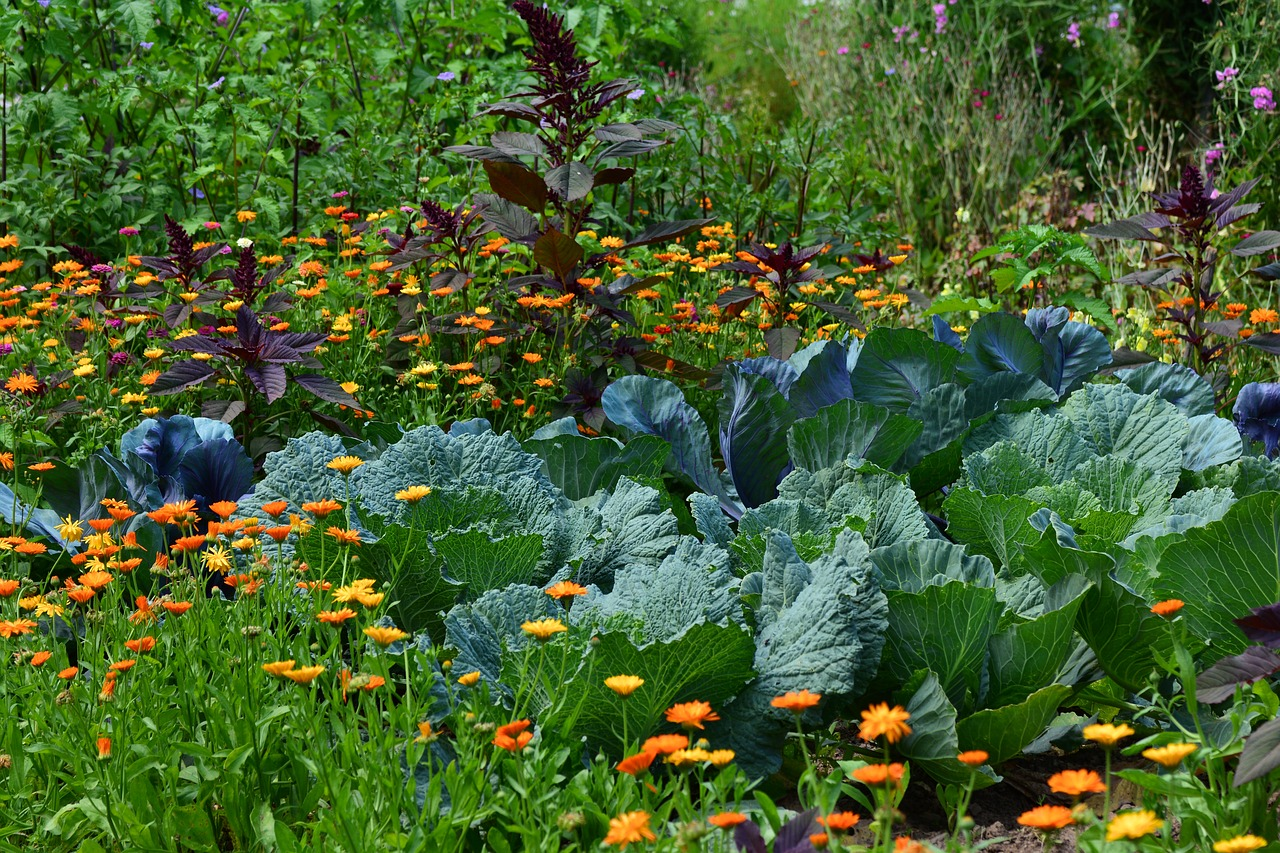
White cabbage garden intermixed with yellow and orange florals.

It is unknown who first coined the expression foodscaping. The term and ideology of foodscaping have been around since the late 20th century, yet have only come into popular use during the 21st century. Despite the modernity of foodscaping, integrating edible plants into landscaping spaces is not a new concept. Similar practices date back to ancient and medieval gardening and agricultural techniques. Foodscaping as a contemporary theory presents "a modern take on the way that past generations utilized land". Unlike most historical horticultural practices, foodscaping explicitly supports the idea that edible landscapes can be just as aesthetically pleasing as purely decorative landscapes. Foodscaping advocates attempt to subvert the conventional perception of vegetable gardens as unattractive and instead view edible crops as design features in and of themselves. It is sometimes believed that this ideology emerged from increasingly experimental approaches to gardening and landscaping in the modern era.

=== Historical precedents of foodscaping ===
Edible landscaping techniques practiced in different historical cultures and periods can be seen as ancestors of foodscaping. In Ancient Rome, Roman villa gardens were often both productive and ornamental, though agricultural production was the primary purpose of earlier villa gardens. Archaeological research suggests that these Roman gardens took on various forms such as large vineyard landscapes or small herb gardens. Kitchen gardens, vineyards, and orchard played an important role in the lives of ancient Romans, whose diets were largely based on fruit and vegetables.

In Mesoamerican culture, elaborate gardens and horticultural gardens were a pleasure of Aztec elites. Flowering, fragrant and medicinal plants were believed to be "perquisites of the lords". According to historical letters written by Aztec nobles, impressive gardens often included bright flower beds, fruit trees, herbs, and sweet-smelling flowers. Groves, orchards, and water gardens were sometimes incorporated into the designs of the more elaborate gardens.

Another ancient precedent to foodscaping can be found in Mesopotamia. Babylonians and Assyrians created gardens throughout cities and in palace courtyards that were a representation of Paradise. These featured fragrant trees and edible fruits. Archaeological evidence suggests that, in roughly 1000 BCE, Assyrian Kings developed a naturalistic landscape style in which streams of water ran through gardens that grew plants such as junipers, almonds, dates, rosewood, quince, fir pomegranate, and oak.

During the Renaissance era, villa and chateau gardens in Europe often yielded fruit and vegetables to sell locally. The profits were used to support the villa's or chateau's maintenance costs. Some of the common kinds of plants integrated into the elaborate Renaissance garden designs included figs, pears, apples, strawberries, cabbage, leeks, onions, and peas.

It is believed that village workers created English cottage gardens during Elizabethan times as a personal source of vegetables. Flowers were also planted within these gardens for ornamental purposes.

=== Recent trends ===
==== Urban growth ====
Urban population growth over the past 500 years

As a result of rapid urbanization seen in recent decades, methods of food production have undergone significant change. According to the United Nations, the Earth's urban population has "grown rapidly from 746 million in 1950 to 3.9 billion in 2014". These accelerated trends in urbanization and population density during the late 20th and 21st century have placed stress on the availability of agricultural land and contributed to growing food insecurity. As a result, there has been an increased desire to re-introduce food growth into urban environments. The ongoing rise in the human population, as well as international goals to reduce hunger and malnutrition, have further escalated the demand for food nutrients.

It is believed that these factors have increased the number of people adopting foodscaping strategies.

== Sustainability ==
=== Food security ===
Foodscaping is widely accepted to increase food security, availability, and accessibility. The instability of supermarket prices can affect food availability. As "self-sufficient food systems", edible landscapes can help decrease a household's dependence on imported food. Foodscaping provides these households with access to a sustainable food source, even when faced with unpredictable circumstances such as the inability to procure food from commercial stores or periods of low financial income.

Depending on the premise's size and scale, significant financial costs can be involved in the initial design and creation of edible landscaping. However, it is still generally accepted that foodscaping can help to lower food costs once the products of the edible plants have been harvested.

In increasing the quantity of locally grown and consumed produce, foodscaping also promotes local food sustainability. It is also believed that foodscaping can help to address the demand for food within the context of global issues such as overpopulation, an unpredictable climate and waning energy resources.

=== Energy and waste management ===
Large-scale agricultural premises typically require large amounts of energy, such as the use of diesel, propane, and electricity to carry out farming operations. The practice of edible landscaping often uses less energy and produces less waste than traditional methods of food production. This is because the food products cultivated from edible landscaping usually involve little processing, packaging or refrigeration.

Foodscaping can also help reduce food miles by decreasing the need for long-distance transportation of food. "A grocery store has on average 1,500 miles per product", says horticulturalists and foodscaping advocate Brie Arthur. These ships and trucks emissions leave a harmful carbon footprint, which could be reduced through the practice of growing edible plants at home instead of buying fresh produce. Foodscaping can further allow participants to help reduce the use of fossil fuel-based pesticides and fertilizers which negatively impact the environment.

=== Health and nutrition ===
A common motivation behind foodscaping is the desire to grow, cook, and consume foods of high nutritious content. In a 2014 research survey conducted by the Australian Institute, 71% of surveyed foodscaping households in Australia were incorporating edibles into their gardens for access to fresh, healthier produce. It is generally accepted that homegrown fruits and vegetables are fresher and more nutritious than supermarket produce, which is sometimes sold multiple days or even weeks after harvesting.

In recent years, increasing concern has been expressed towards the health effects of the chemical additives and preservatives in commercially grown fruit and vegetables. Foodscaping has been considered a way to reduce exposure to chemically modified produce.

Edible landscaping allows participants to increase fresh food production in urban areas. In these areas, the most accessible kinds of food are typically processed kinds, which can lead to greater dietary intakes of sugar, sodium, and fat. Many academic studies have inferred strong links between urban gardening and healthy lifestyle choices. The gardening practices involved in foodscaping are believed to increase participants' fruit and vegetable consumption and the value of preparing nutritious meals.

Research has also demonstrated that creating green spaces (created via methods such as foodscaping) can increase an individual's overall mental health in addition to physiological health benefits. This is achieved through its positive impact on socioeconomic factors such as community attachment, reduced crime, and socialization.

== Maintenance ==
=== Input ===
Depending on the scale of the edible landscape, foodscaping may require extra time and manual labour to maintain, unlike a regular garden or landscape. This is as the aim of foodscaping is to yield edible returns while also remaining aesthetically pleasing, which may involve added watering, fertilization, pest control and pruning. A lack of time and unsuitable conditions such as climate and insufficient shade can be significant deterrents for people wishing to create edible landscapes. However, maintenance requirements can be reduced by choosing plant species that are suited to the geographic location, climate, and conditions of the area to be foodscaped.

=== Harvesting ===
During certain times of the year, monitoring the ripeness of food production is a requirement for successful foodcaping. If fruits are not harvested at the correct time, they may rot and become visually unappealing within an edible landscape. This may also attract undesired pests or vermin.

== Plants ==
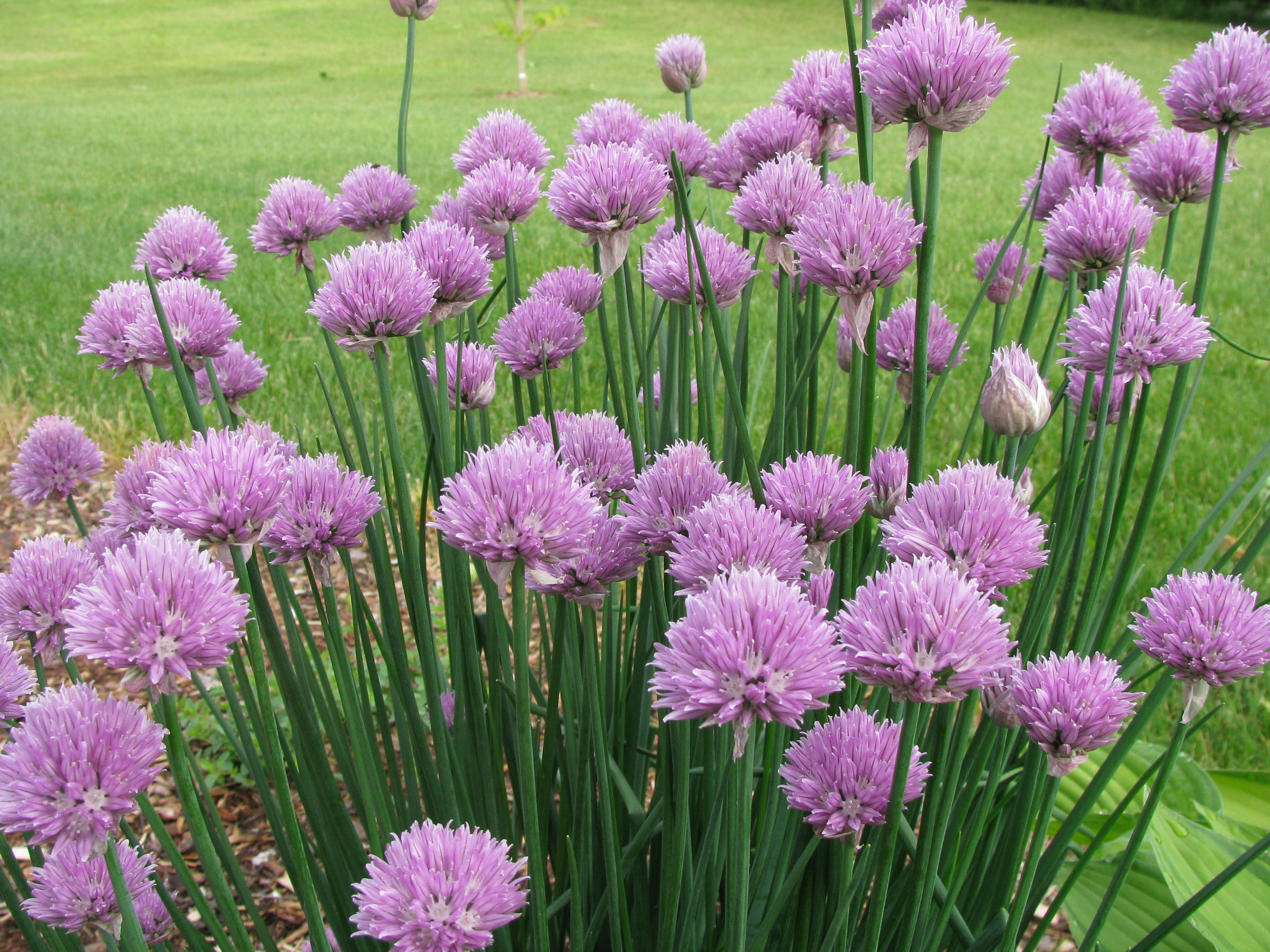
Flowering chives make a colourful addition to an edible landscape.

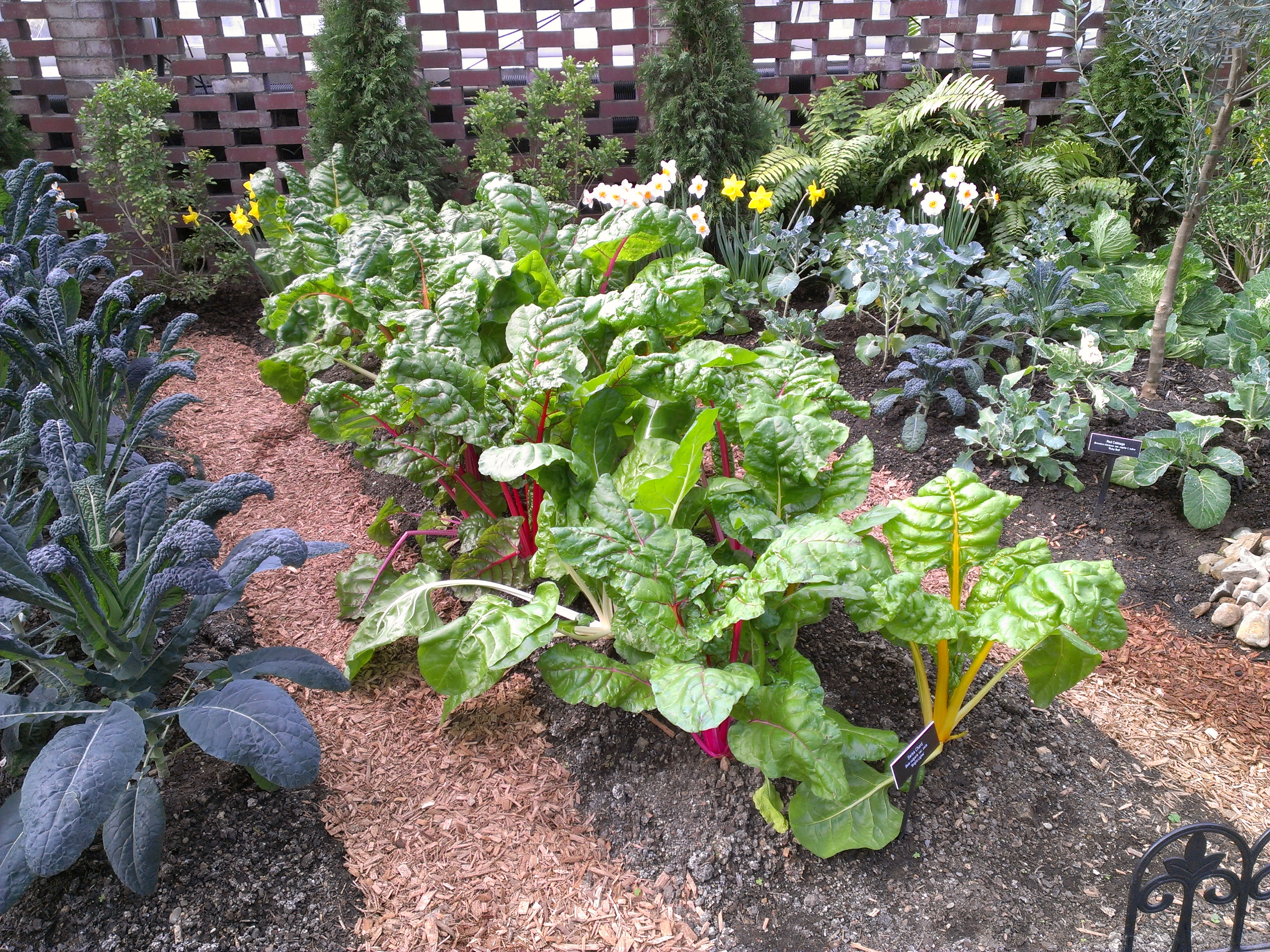
A row of Swiss chard at Phipps Conservatory, Pittsburgh, Pennsylvania. Swiss chard is often used in foodscaping for its vibrant colours.

Plants in foodscaping designs are typically chosen for their aesthetic and edible appeal. Many vegetables can add colour to foodscaping spaces. Swiss chard, cabbage, and lettuce species come in many colourful varieties, making them a popular choice for foodscaping. Edible flowers, such as carnations, marigolds, cornflowers and pansies can also be used to add decoration and brightness to an edible landscape.

Garden writer Charlie Nardozzi suggests that lemon, apple, plum, and cherry trees can serve as edible alternatives for ornamental trees. He also proposes that blueberry, elderberry and gooseberry plants can substitute popular decorative shrubs such as roses, hydrangeas and privet hedges. Alpine strawberries and chives have also been suggested as suitable replacements for non-edible flowering plants.

Edible landscapes generally consist of a combination of annual and perennial plants. When planning an edible landscape, it is important to know that certain plants require particular environmental conditions. One should also consider the seasonality of the edible plants being used, meaning the time of the year during which a certain species will grow best. Cool season crops require lower temperatures for growth and seed germination, whilst warm season crops are plants that thrive in higher soil and air temperatures. In hot climates, the ideal plants for foodscaping are those that require little water, such as beans, spinach and broccoli. Whilst certain fruit trees, berries and rhubarb are suitable for cooler climates, root vegetables, cabbages and peas are examples of plants that cope well in extremely cold conditions.

Examples of plants used in foodscaping
Plant Family	Examples
Amaranthaceae	Chard • spinach • quinoa • beetroot • glasswort
Apiaceae	Carrots • celery • cilantro/coriander • cumin • fennel • parsley • parsnips • anise • chervil • dill • anise • parsnip • caraway
Asteraceae	Artichokes • chamomile • cardoons • tarragon • lettuce • endive • dandelions • chicory • calendula • golden rod • chrysanthemum • cornflower • echinacea • elecampane • feverfew • mouse ears • mugwort • stevia • pansy • bellis perennis • blessed thistle • groundsel
Brassicaceae	Broccoli • kale • cabbage • cauliflower • Brussels sprouts • mustard • collard
Ericaceae	Blueberries • huckleberries • rhododendron • Azaleas
Lamiaceae	Sage • rosemary • thyme • oregano • basil • catnip • lavender • marjoram • white horehound • peppermint • spearmint
Liliaceae	Garlic • asparagus • chives • shallots • onions • leeks • Tulips • fritillaria • lilies
Rosaceae	Strawberries • cherries • raspberries • blackberries • pears • apple • plums • peaches • apricots • quinces • almond
Solanaceae	Tomatoes • tomatillos • capsicum/bell peppers • potatoes • eggplant • chili peppers

=== Gallery ===
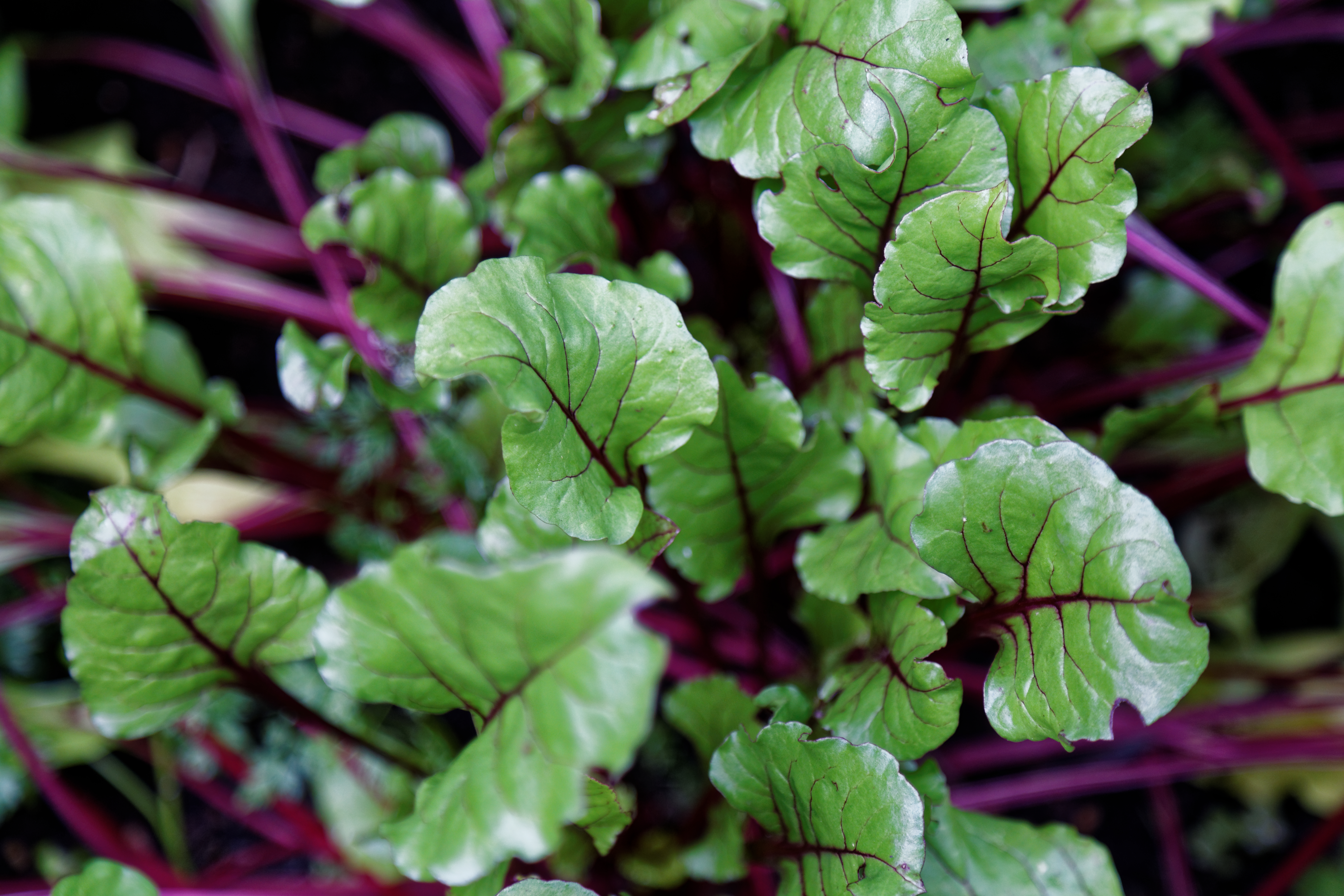
Beetroot (Beta vulgaris)

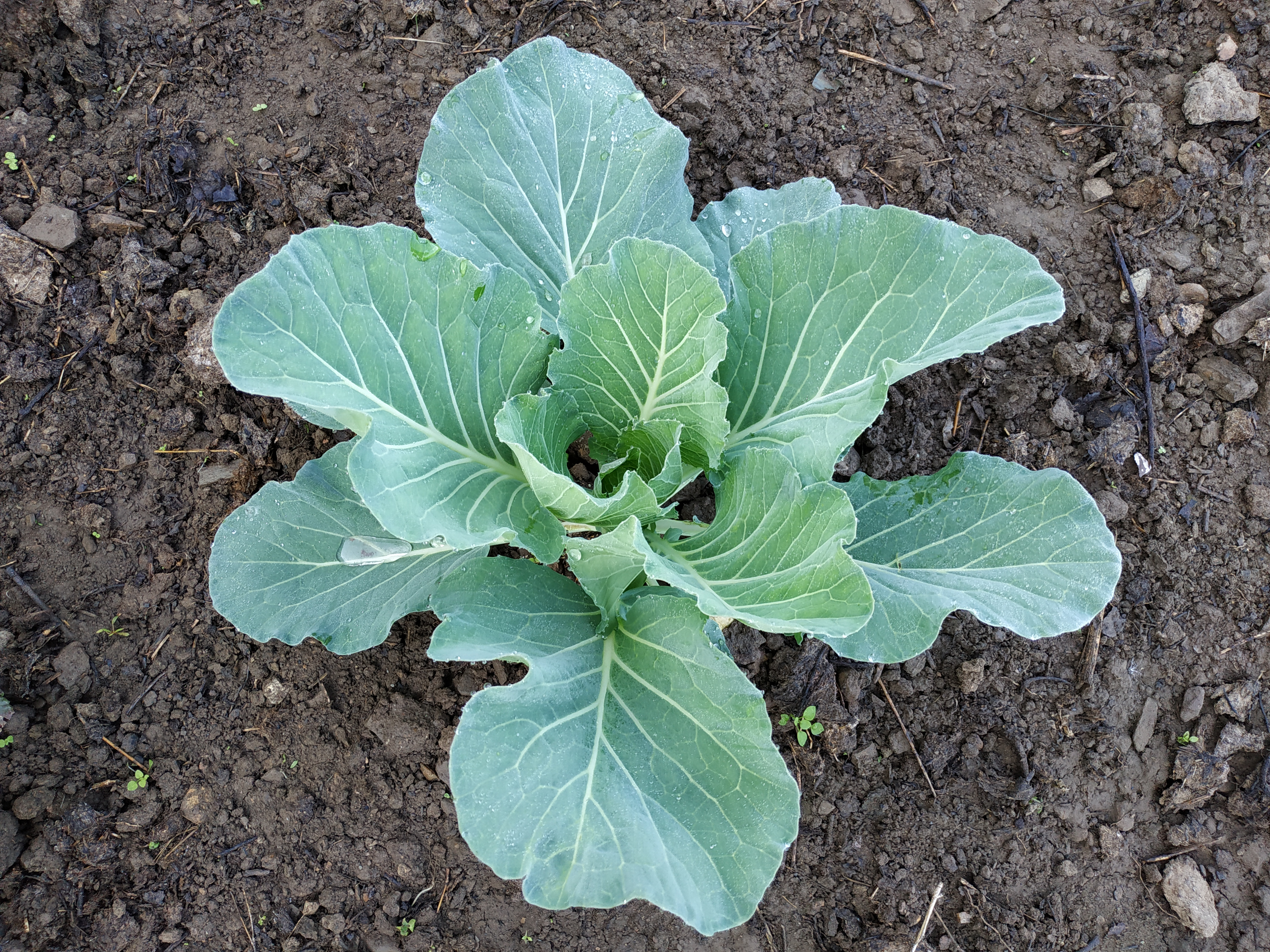
Cabbage (Brassica oleracea var. capitata)

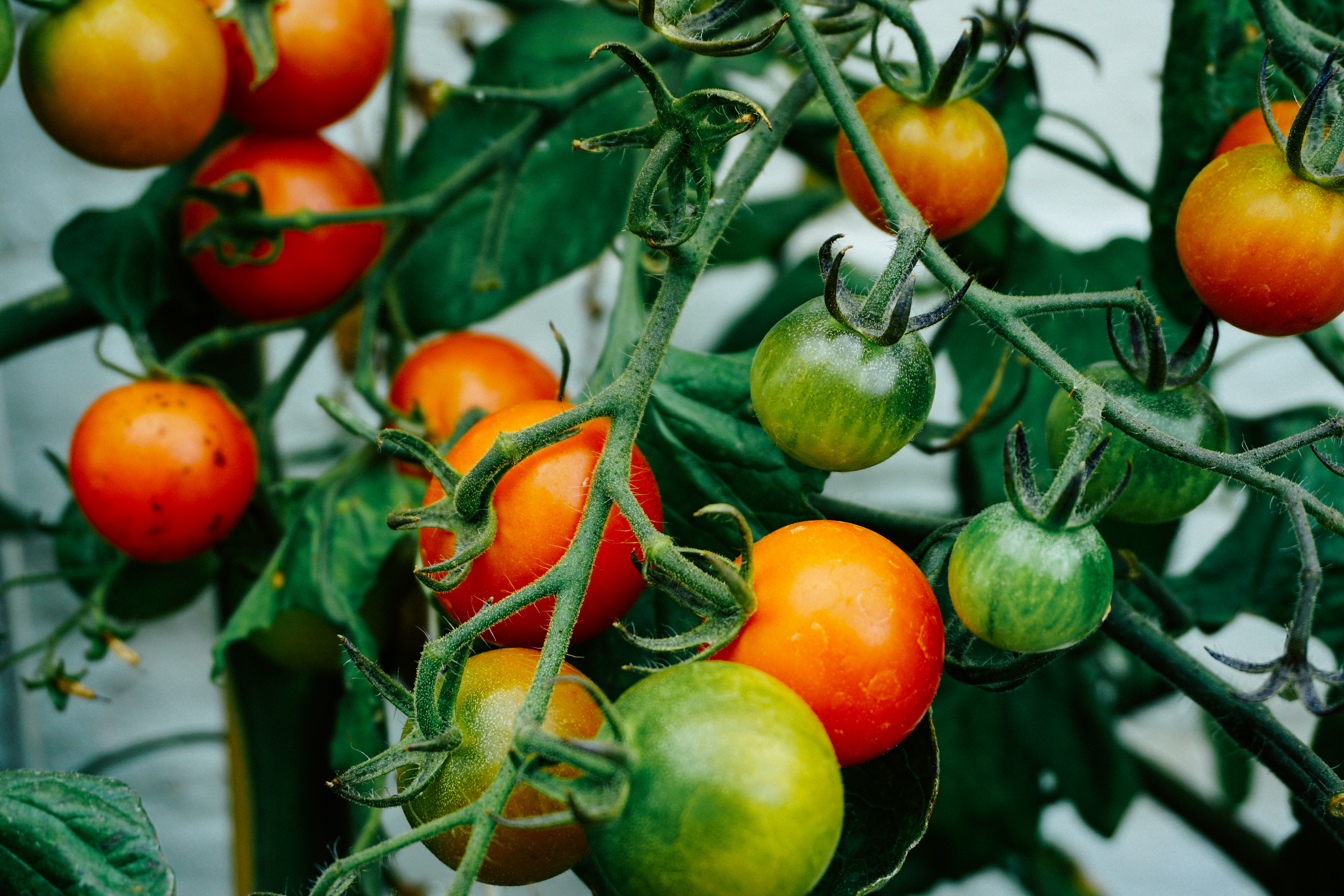
Tomato vine (Solanum lycopersicum)

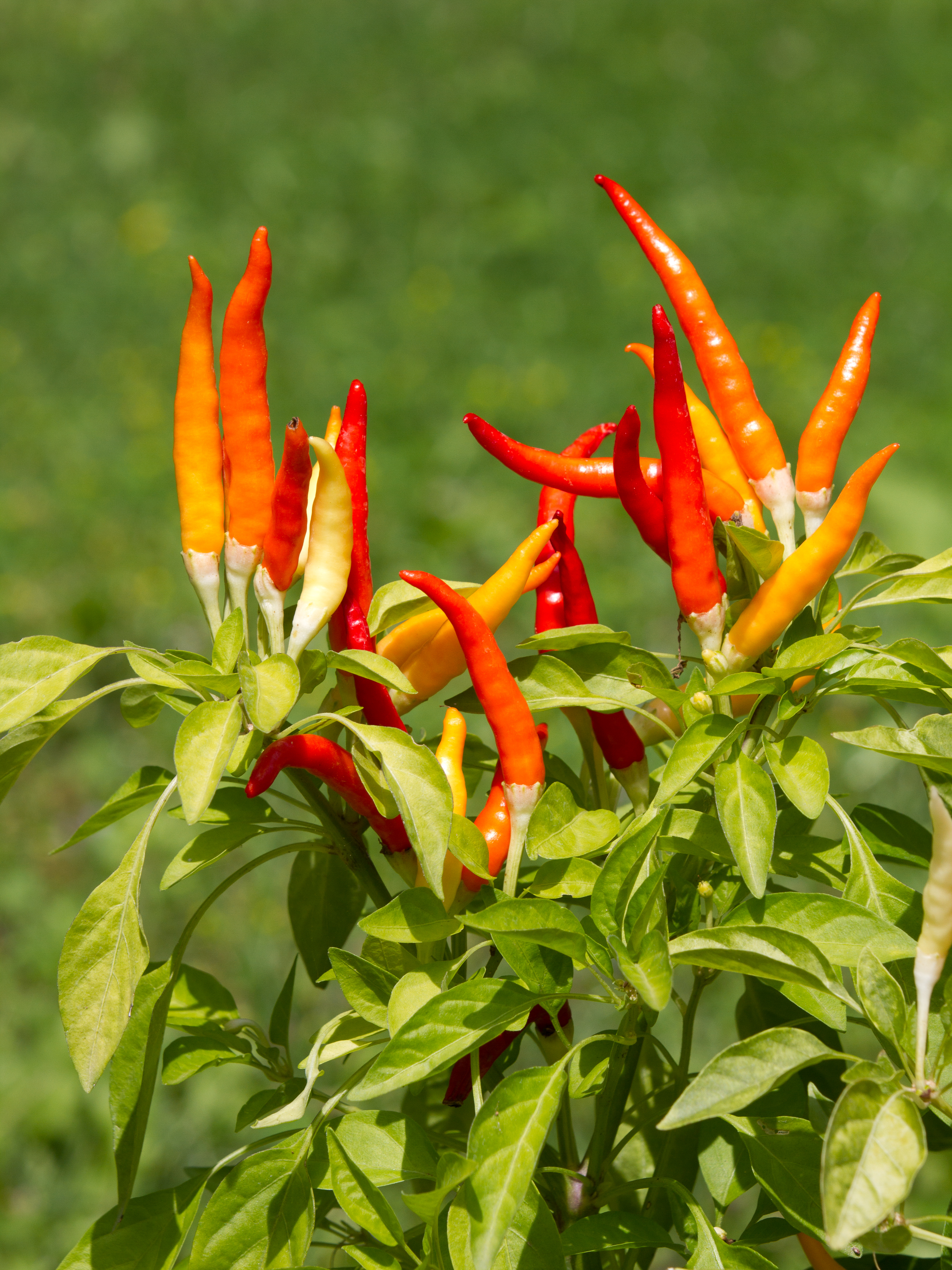
Chili peppers (Capsicum annuum)

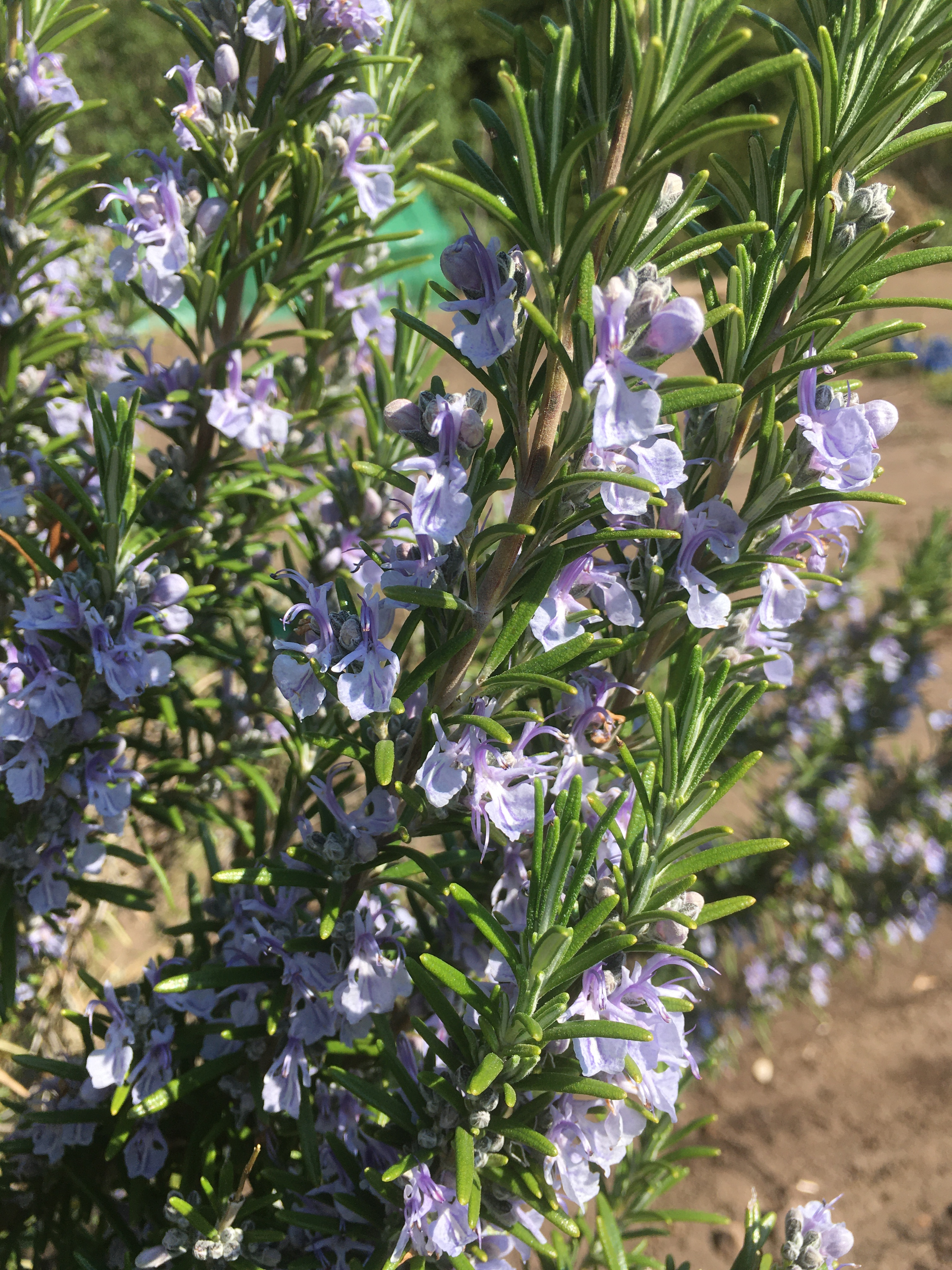
Flowering rosemary (Salvia rosmarinus)

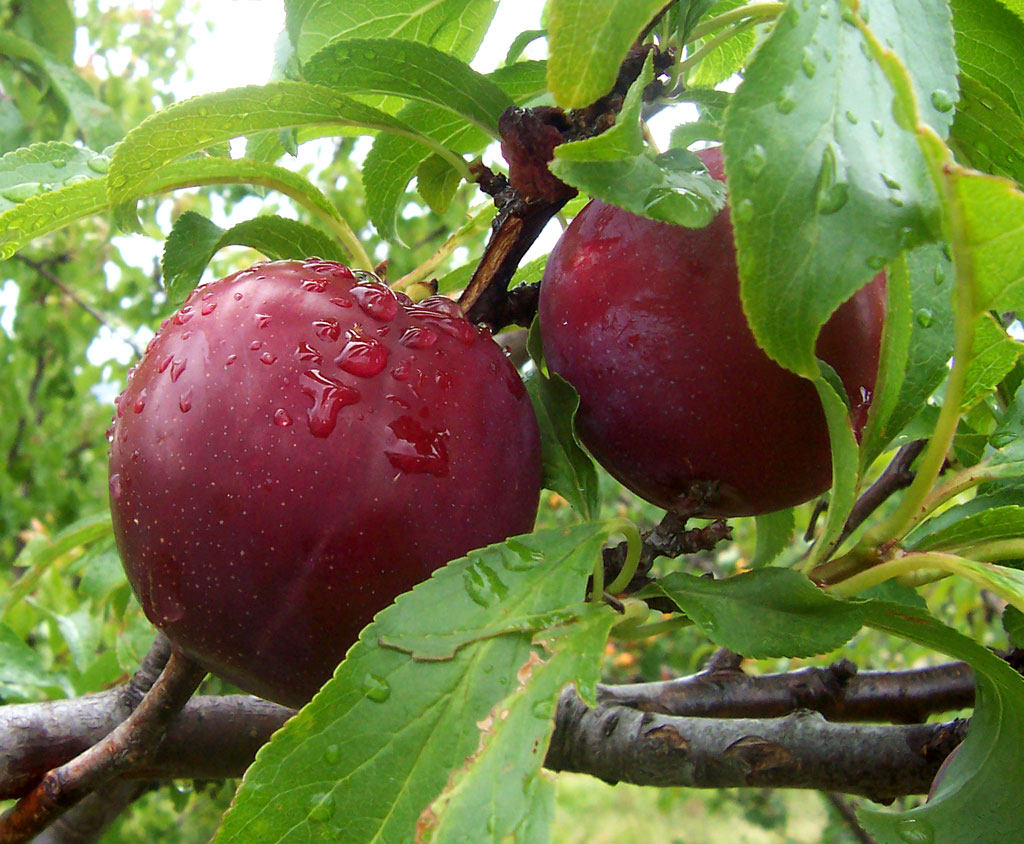
Plum (Prunus domestica)

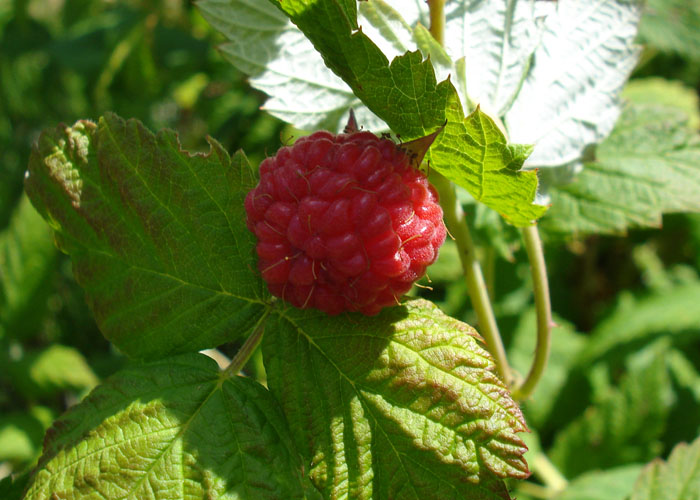
Raspberry (Rubus idaeus)

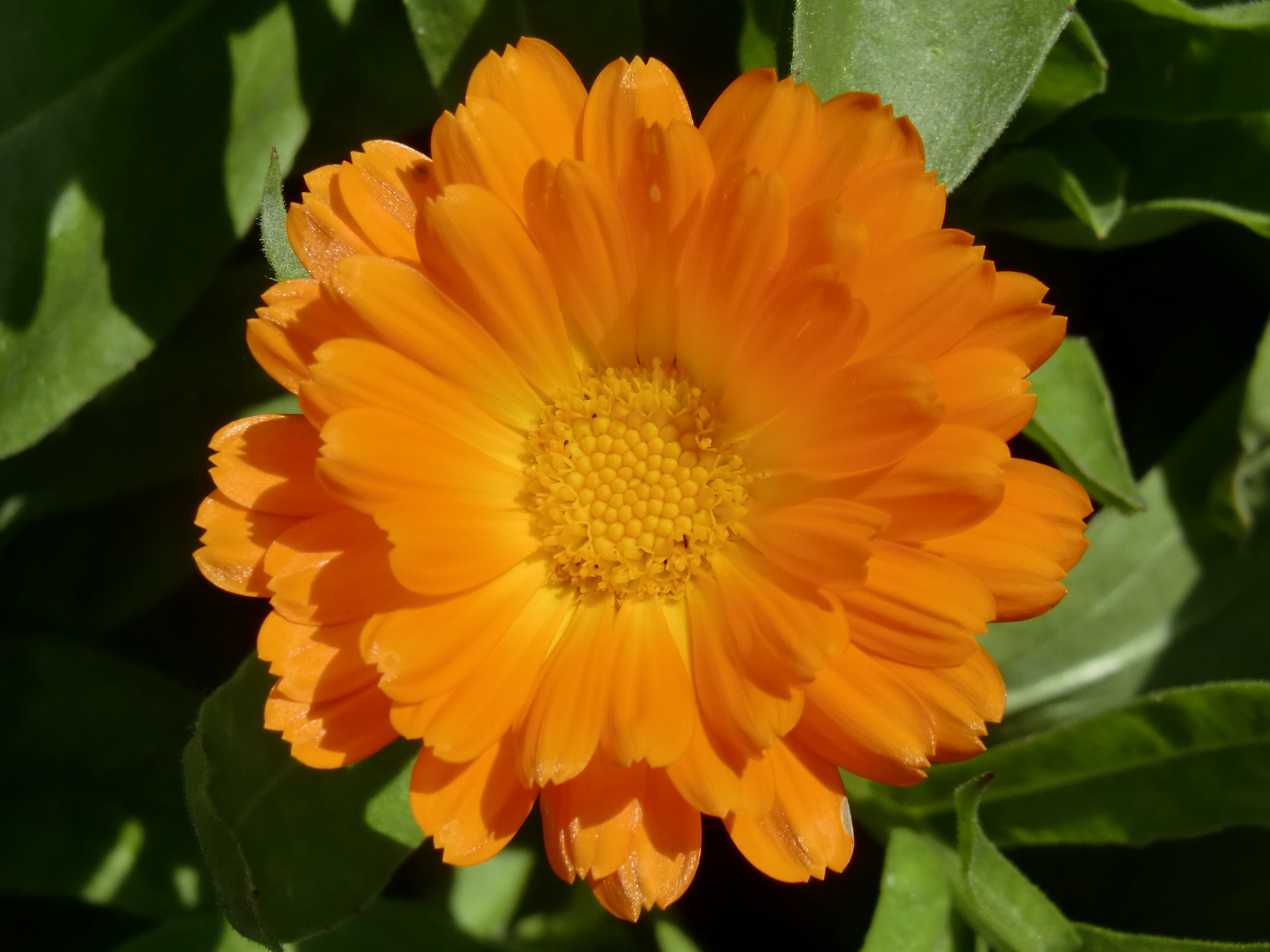
Calendula flower (Calendula officinalis)

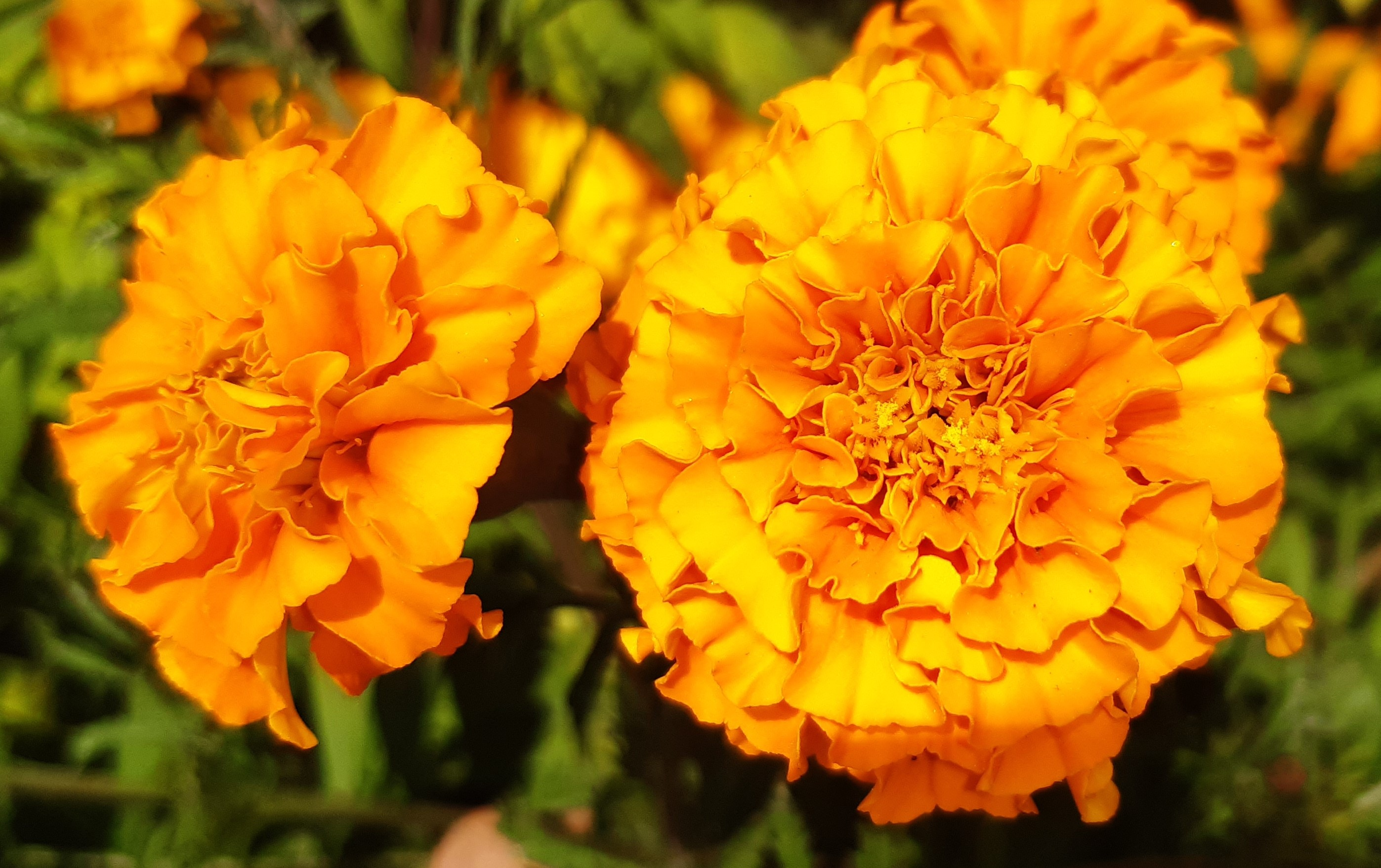
Marigold flower (Tagetes erecta)

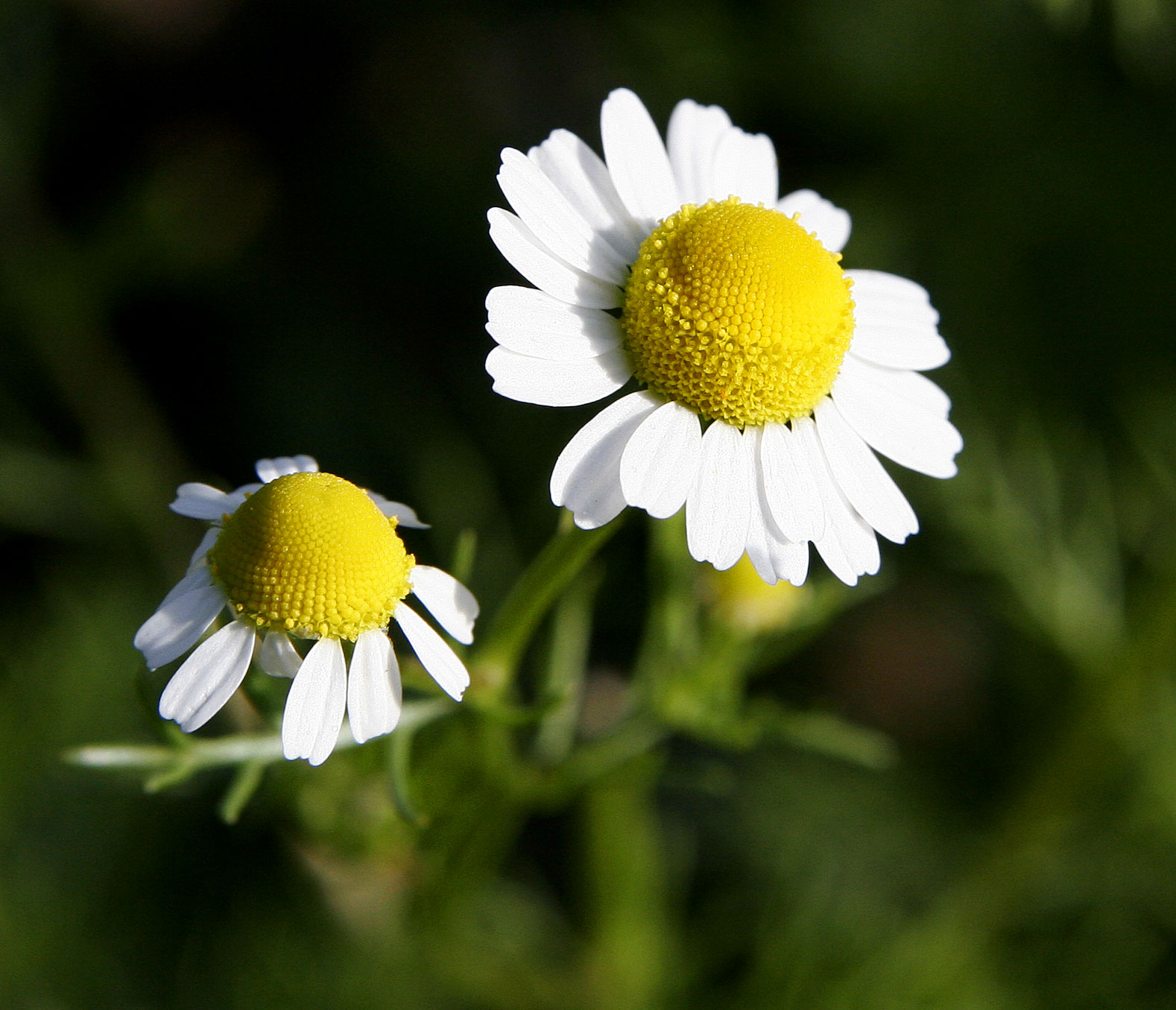
Camomile flower (Matricaria chamomilla)

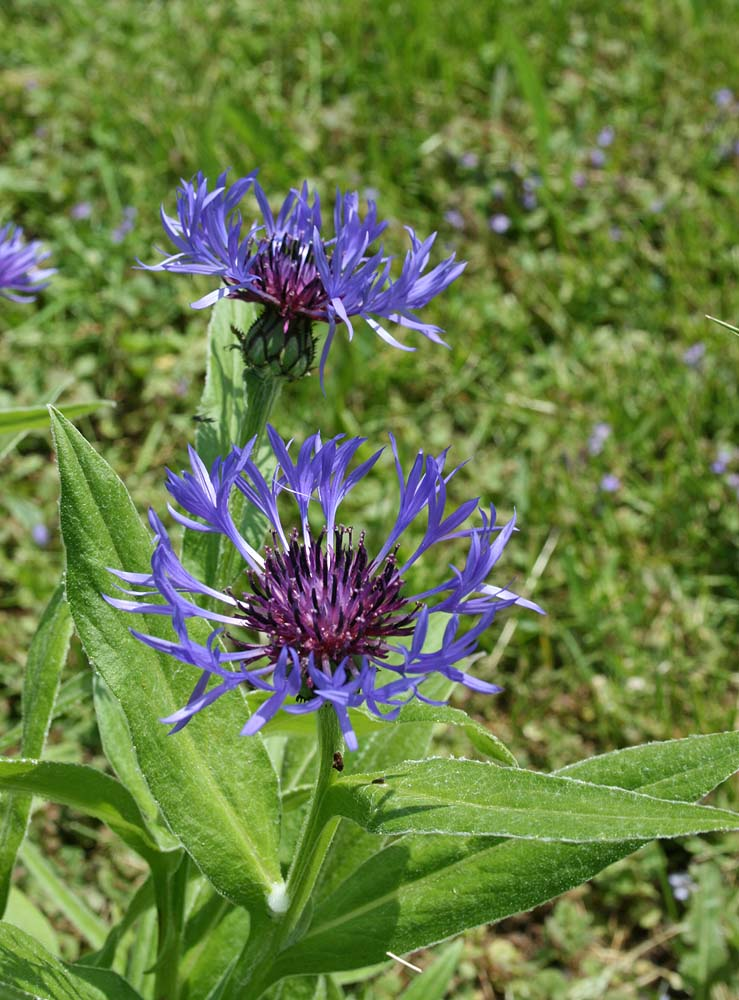
Cornflower (Centaurea cyanus)

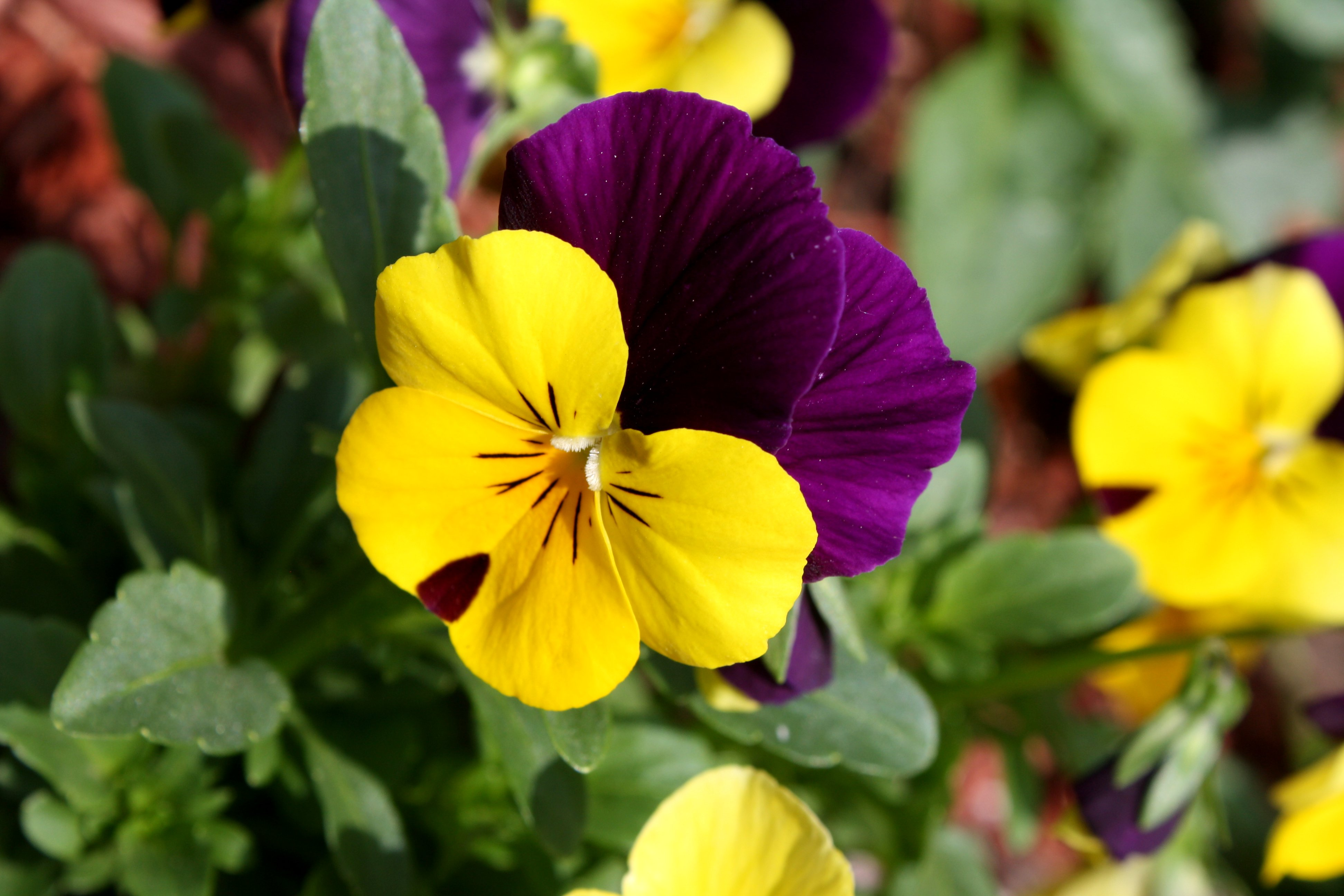
Pansy flower (Viola tricolor var. hortensis)

== Examples of foodscaping ==
=== People ===
Landscape designer and author Rosalind Creasy has frequently been named the "pioneer of edible landscapes" in gardening-related media and publications. Since the 1970s, she has written over twenty books on edible landscaping. One of her most influential works in foodscaping is her book The Complete Book of Edible Landscaping, published in 1982.

Brie Arthur is an American professional horticulturalist who has been noted as a public advocate for the practice of suburban foodscaping. In order to challenge the idea that ornamental landscapes can't involve edible plants, she has spoken publicly at schools, worked with television programs, and been involved in various horticulture-related associations. Her debut book titled The Foodscape Revolution, Finding a Better Way to Make Space for Food and Beauty in Your Garden was published in 2017.

=== Public projects ===
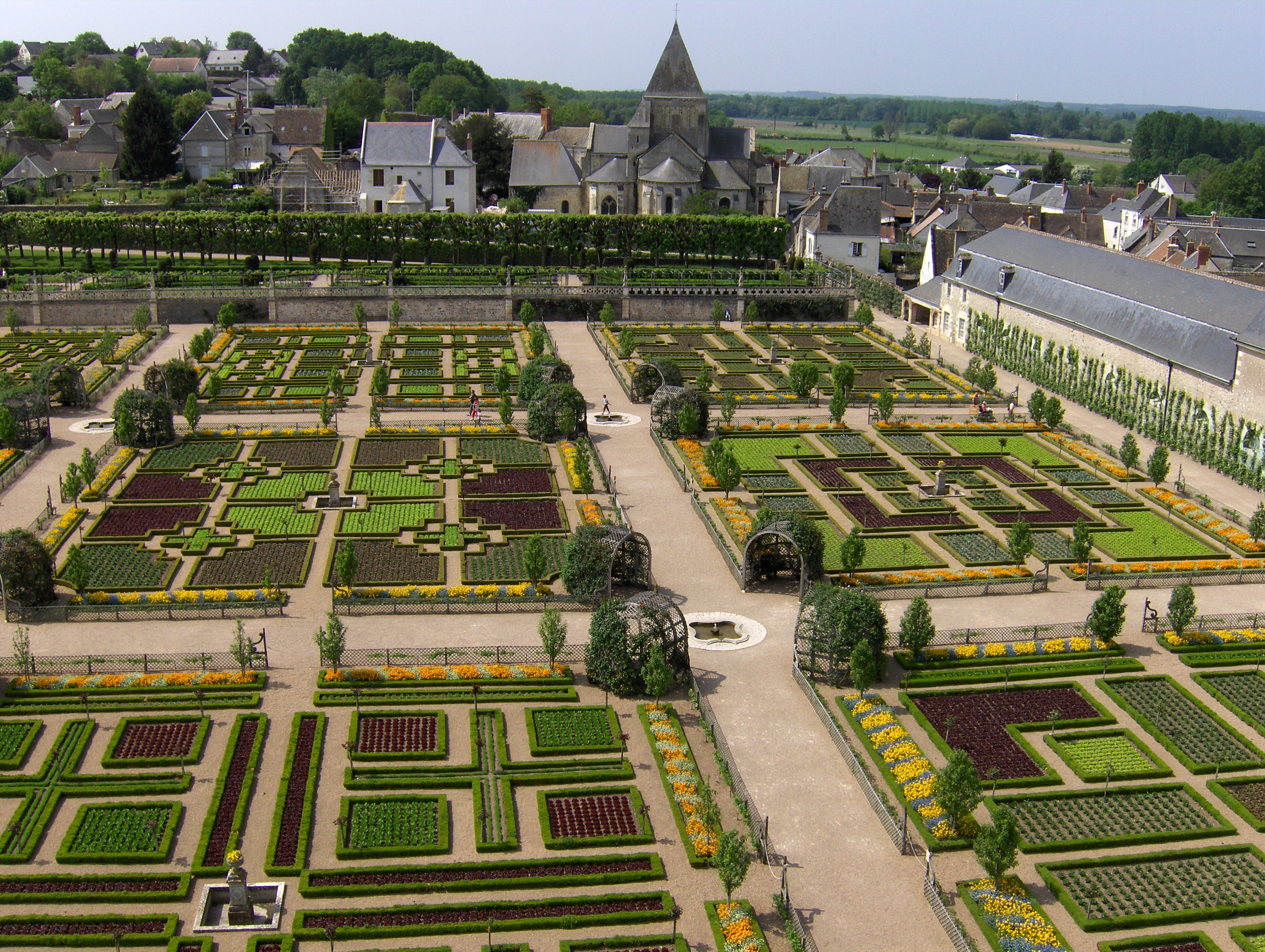
High angle view of six of the nine square vegetable patches in the chateau of Villandry's Ornamental Kitchen Garden.

The Ornamental Kitchen Garden is an edible landscape on the grounds of the château of Villandry, located in the Loire Valley region of France. The Italian Renaissance-style garden is composed of nine square patches, each featuring a geometric design of flowers and vegetables whose design layouts change with each bi-annual planting. These patches are lined with neat box hedges, and each displays vegetables of different colours such red cabbage, beetroot and blue leek. Each year, forty species of vegetables within eight plant families are planted.

Based in Iowa, Backyard Abundance is a non-profit organization founded in 2006 that aims to educate more people about edible landscaping. They encourage community residents to take part in creating transformative landscapes that can help to reduce human impact on the environment.

Founded in Kansas, 2006, Edible Estates is a foodscaping initiative that works with local art institutions and community garden groups in different cities worldwide to create productive edible landscape designs.

Edible Landscapes London is a non-profit organization that creates productive forest gardening spaces that integrate fruiting trees and herbs. They created the first-ever accredited course that trains people in forest gardening practices. According to Lindsay Oberst in an article on Food Revolution Network, Edible Estates "strives to inspire others to look at underused or misappropriated green spaces in a new light, highlighting new contexts for food production and connections to the natural environment".

NYU's Urban Farm Lab is a collaborative urban agriculture project promoting the integration of edible crops into urban environments. They have implemented foodscaping techniques in many spots around the university's campus.

The Eden Project is a sustainability project in Cornwall, England, which attracts over a million yearly visitors. The 15-hectare site features large domes and a food garden, with edible produce incorporated into the landscaping design.

The Food Forest is a property in Adelaide, Australia, which grows 160 varieties of organic fruit, nuts, wheat, and vegetables on 15 hectares of land. The owners educate visitors on how ordinary families can grow their food at home by creating productive foodscapes.

The Netherlands' first "roof field" was created on top of a large office building near Rotterdam's central station in 2012 by Binder Groenprojecten. The 1000m^{2} "roof field" is used to grow vegetables, fruits, and Herbs, and also houses honeybees.

Wayward is a landscaping, art and architecture firm based in London that combines creative food growing with contemporary art and architecture installations.

== Potential Limitations ==
Although Foodscaping has the potential to reduce Carbon dioxide emissions, promote food security, and reduce food miles there are also limitations to Foodscaping. There are many questions about the biosafety of Foodscaping especially since public urban greenery is used for recreational purposes by communities due to lack of nature oriented places. There are biosafety concerns since they are in public spaces where humans and animals are frequently there there, it can lead to an incorporation of a hazardous components into the landscape. Due to their position in public spaces there is a prohibition of pesticides and fertilizers for the public plants as they might be harmful to visitors. It can also affect the plants in the garden if they are exposed as they might cause harm to visitors.

== See also ==
- Allotment garden
- Aquascaping
- Back garden
- Climate-friendly gardening
- Community garden
- Computer-aided garden design
- Flower garden
- Forest gardening
- Garden designer
- Garden buildings
- Index of gardening articles
- Landscape architecture
- List of gardening topics
- Open Gardens
- Naturescaping
- Pizza farm
- Roof garden
- Royal Horticultural Society
- Sustainable landscaping
- Urban horticulture
- Vertical farming
- Victory garden
- Xeriscaping
