= Ulevitch =

Ulevitch is a surname. Notable people with the surname include:

- David Ulevitch (born 1981), American entrepreneur
- Richard Ulevitch, American professor
