= Route 53 =

Route 53 may refer to:

== Other uses ==
- Route 53 (WMATA), a bus route in Washington, D.C.
- London Buses route 53
- SEPTA Route 53 a former streetcar and current bus route in Northwest Philadelphia
- Amazon Route 53, a managed DNS service
