= List of managed DNS providers =

This is a list of notable managed DNS providers in a comparison table. A managed DNS provider offers either a web-based control panel or downloadable software that allows users to manage their DNS traffic via specified protocols such as: DNS failover, dynamic IP addresses, SMTP authentication, and GeoDNS.

Provider	Domicile	# of PoPs	IP Anycast	IPv6	DNSSEC	Platform	GeoDNS	SLA	APIs
Akamai Edge DNS	US	+200	Yes	Yes	Yes	Proprietary	Yes	100%	REST
Amazon Route 53	US	63	Yes	Yes	Yes	non-BIND	Yes	100%	REST
Azure DNS	US	Unknown	Yes	Yes	No	Microsoft DNS	Yes	100%	REST
CDNetworks	US	48	Yes	No	?	BIND Compatible	Yes	100%	REST
Cloudflare	US	200	Yes	Yes	Yes	Proprietary	Yes	100%	REST
DigitalOcean	US	Unknown	?	Yes	No	non-BIND	No	99.99%	REST
Dyn	US	18	Yes	Yes	?	BIND Compatible	Yes	100%	REST/SOAP
easyDNS	Canada	25	Yes	Yes	Yes	Unknown	Yes	100%	REST
Google Cloud DNS	US	12	Yes	Yes	Yes	non-BIND	No	100%	REST
No-IP	US	102	Yes	Yes	?	BIND Compatible	No	100%	REST
NSResolver	US	23	Yes	Yes	Yes	non-BIND	No	100%	REST
Telindus	Belgium	Unknown	Yes	Yes	?	non-BIND	Yes	100%	REST/SOAP
UltraDNS	US	30	Yes	Yes	Yes	non-BIND	Yes	100%	REST/SOAP
Alibaba Cloud DNS	Cayman Islands	20	Yes	Yes	Yes	BIND compatible	Yes	100%	REST
Oracle Cloud DNS	US	40	Yes	Yes	Yes	BIND compatible	Yes	100%	REST

== See also ==
- Public recursive name server
