= T. M. Harrier =

Japanese Thoroughbred steeplechase racehorse (foaled 2006)

T. M. Harrier テイエムハリアー
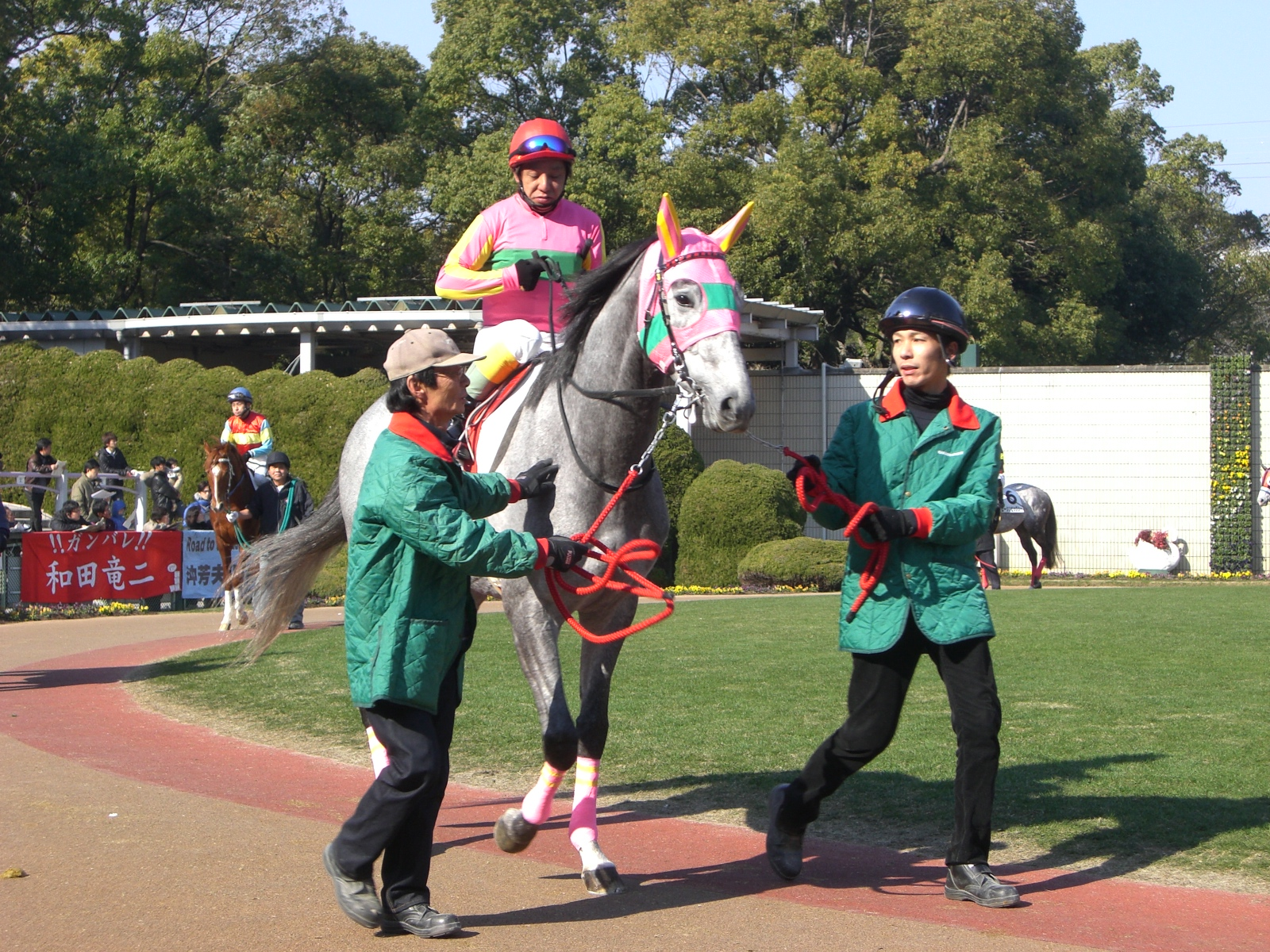
- T. M. Harrier in January 2010
- Breed: Thoroughbred
- Sire: New England
- Grandsire: Sunday Silence
- Dam: Feriado
- Damsire: Stately Don
- Sex: Gelding
- Foaled: 30 April 2006
- Country: Japan
- Colour: Gray
- Breeder: Taniguchi Bokujo
- Owner: Masatsugu Takezono
- Racing colours
- Trainer: Tadao Igarashi
- Jockey: Shigefumi Kumazawa; Yuzo Shirahama
- Record: 36: 10-5-5 (21 steeplechase: 9-4-1)
- Earnings: ¥261,329,000

Major wins
- Kyoto High Jump (2013); Kyoto Jump Stakes (2011); Hanshin Jump Stakes (2012)

T. M. Harrier (Japanese: テイエムハリアー, Hepburn: Tī Emu Hariā; foaled 30 April 2006) is a retired Japanese Thoroughbred steeplechase racehorse. He competed from 2009 to 2014, recording ten wins in thirty-six starts, including the Kyoto High Jump (J-GII) in 2013, the Kyoto Jump Stakes (J-GIII) in 2011, and the Hanshin Jump Stakes (J-GIII) in 2012. He is the half-brother of T. M. Precure, the 2005 JRA Award for Best Two-Year-Old Filly.

== Background ==
T. M. Harrier is a gray horse bred in Niikappu, Hokkaido, by Taniguchi Bokujo. He was sired by New England, a son of Sunday Silence, and his dam was Feriado, a daughter of the American-bred stallion Stately Don. His dam is also the dam of T. M. Precure, who won the Hanshin Juvenile Fillies in 2005. His racing name combines the "T. M." prefix used by owner Masatsugu Takezono with "Harrier," named after the fighter aircraft. He was sent into training with Tadao Igarashi at the JRA's Ritto Training Center.

== Racing career ==
=== 2009: Three-year-old season (flat) ===
T. M. Harrier debuted on January 4, 2009, in a maiden race on the turf at Kyoto Racecourse, finishing sixth. He ran in thirteen subsequent flat races through December, recording one win (a maiden race at Sapporo Racecourse on June 28) and five third-place finishes.

=== 2010: Four-year-old season (transition to steeplechase) ===
T. M. Harrier made his steeplechase debut on January 17, 2010, in an open hurdle race at Kyoto, winning by 0.8 seconds in a track record time of 3:12.2. He won the Yodo Jump Stakes (Open) in February. He finished seventh in the Hanshin Spring Jump (J-GII) in March, third in the Kyoto High Jump (J-GII) in May, and second in the Kyoto Jump Stakes (J-GIII) in November.

=== 2011: Five-year-old season ===
T. M. Harrier won the Ushiwakamaru Jump Stakes (Open) in January. He was unseated in the Hanshin Spring Jump (J-GII) in March and finished sixth in the Tokyo High Jump (J-GII) in October. On November 12, he won the Kyoto Jump Stakes (J-GIII) at Kyoto, defeating El Junction by 0.1 seconds in a track record time of 3:30.4.

=== 2012: Six-year-old season ===
T. M. Harrier won the Ushiwakamaru Jump Stakes (Open) for a second consecutive year in January. He finished second in the Kyoto High Jump (J-GII) in May and second in the Kokura Summer Jump (J-GIII) in July. On September 15, he won the Hanshin Jump Stakes (J-GIII) at Hanshin Racecourse, defeating Narita Shuttle by 0.2 seconds in a track record time of 3:25.6. He was unseated in the Kyoto Jump Stakes (J-GIII) in November.

=== 2013: Seven-year-old season ===
T. M. Harrier won the Ushiwakamaru Jump Stakes (Open) for a third consecutive year in January. He was unseated in the Hanshin Spring Jump (J-GII) in March. On May 12, he won the Kyoto High Jump (J-GII) at Kyoto, defeating High Roller by 0.5 seconds. He finished second in the Hanshin Jump Stakes (J-GIII) in September.

=== 2014: Eight-year-old season and retirement ===
T. M. Harrier made his final start in the Hanshin Spring Jump (J-GII) on March 15, 2014, finishing eighth. Following the race, he was diagnosed with a partial rupture of the right superficial digital flexor tendon. He was retired the following day. He subsequently became a riding horse at Keihoku Ikusei Bokujo in Ukyo-ku, Kyoto.

== Statistics ==
The following table details all 36 starts of T. M. Harrier's racing career based on official netkeiba and JBIS records.

Date	Distance (Condition)	Race	Class	Course	Odds (Favourite)	Field	Finish	Time	Jockey	Winning (Losing) Margin	Winner (2nd Place)	Ref
2009 – three-year-old season (flat)
Jan 4	Turf 1800 m (Firm)	3-Y-O Newcomer	Maiden	Kyoto	40.6 (9th)	13	6th	1:49.9	Shigefumi Kumazawa	1.0	Red Desire	
Jan 24	Dirt 1700 m (Soft)	3-Y-O Maiden	Maiden	Chukyo	4.8 (2nd)	16	13th	1:50.4	Takuma Ogino	2.8	Dust Up	
Feb 22	Turf 2000 m (Firm)	3-Y-O Maiden	Maiden	Kyoto	20.2 (6th)	15	5th	2:04.1	Tetsuya Kobayashi	0.3	Blue Mauritius	
Mar 8	Turf 2000 m (Firm)	3-Y-O Maiden	Maiden	Hanshin	30.2 (9th)	15	4th	2:05.8	Kyosuke Kokubu	0.4	Real Prince	
Mar 28	Turf 2200 m (Firm)	3-Y-O Maiden	Maiden	Hanshin	10.4 (4th)	18	3rd	2:16.9	Kyosuke Kokubu	0.6	My First Love	
Apr 11	Turf 2000 m (Firm)	3-Y-O Maiden	Maiden	Hanshin	13.1 (5th)	15	3rd	2:04.8	Kyosuke Kokubu	0.3	Bombarina	
May 2	Turf 1800 m (Firm)	3-Y-O Maiden	Maiden	Kyoto	3.2 (1st)	14	3rd	1:48.6	Kyosuke Kokubu	0.6	Lord Latte Art	
May 17	Turf 1800 m (Firm)	3-Y-O Maiden	Maiden	Kyoto	4.6 (3rd)	14	3rd	1:48.9	Yukio Abe	0.2	Agnes Sakura	
Jun 20	Turf 2000 m (Firm)	3-Y-O Maiden	Maiden	Sapporo	3.1 (2nd)	16	6th	2:03.0	Shinji Fujita	0.5	Air Patience	
Jun 28	Turf 1800 m (Firm)	3-Y-O Maiden	Maiden	Sapporo	3.5 (2nd)	13	1st	1:48.9	Shinji Fujita	–0.3	(Hokko Big One)	
Jul 19	Turf 1800 m (Soft)	Soya Tokubetsu	Allowance	Sapporo	20.4 (8th)	14	10th	1:51.5	Koshiro Take	1.1	Air Shatush	
Aug 16	Turf 1800 m (Firm)	Rumoi Tokubetsu	Allowance	Sapporo	36.5 (10th)	14	11th	1:50.3	Koshiro Take	1.1	Masano Wiz Kid	
Nov 14	Turf 2000 m (Soft)	3-Y-O Allowance	Allowance	Kyoto	207.3 (17th)	17	3rd	2:01.5	Kyosuke Kokubu	0.2	Walk Crown	
Dec 5	Turf 1800 m (Good)	3-Y-O Allowance	Allowance	Hanshin	17.8 (7th)	18	11th	1:48.5	Kyosuke Kokubu	0.7	Meisho Jinmu	
2010 – four-year-old season (steeplechase)
Jan 17	Hurdle 2930 m (Firm)	4-Y-O Hurdle Maiden	Maiden	Kyoto	20.4 (6th)	14	1st	R3:12.2	Shigefumi Kumazawa	–0.8	(Sea Spear)	
Feb 13	Hurdle 3790 m (Good)	Yodo Jump Stakes	Open	Kyoto	3.0 (1st)	14	1st	4:18.5	Shigefumi Kumazawa	–0.0	(Shoryuken)	
Mar 13	Hurdle 3900 m (Firm)	Hanshin Spring Jump	J-GII	Hanshin	4.0 (1st)	14	7th	4:22.4	Shigefumi Kumazawa	1.7	Towa Vega	
May 15	Hurdle 3930 m (Firm)	Kyoto High Jump	J-GII	Kyoto	4.9 (3rd)	14	3rd	4:24.3	Mitsuru Hayashi	1.2	A Shin DS	
Oct 9	Hurdle 3170 m (Good)	3-Y-O Hurdle Open	Open	Kyoto	1.8 (1st)	13	1st	3:34.2	Yuzo Shirahama	–2.2	(Glocken Line)	
Nov 13	Hurdle 3170 m (Firm)	Kyoto Jump Stakes	J-GIII	Kyoto	3.0 (1st)	12	2nd	3:32.5	Yuzo Shirahama	0.8	Ranheranba	
2011 – five-year-old season
Jan 15	Hurdle 3170 m (Firm)	Ushiwakamaru Jump Stakes	Open	Kyoto	3.6 (2nd)	14	1st	3:32.2	Yuzo Shirahama	–0.4	(Ranheranba)	
Mar 21	Hurdle 3900 m (Good)	Hanshin Spring Jump	J-GII	Hanshin	4.5 (2nd)	14	DNF	–	Yuzo Shirahama	–	Open Garden	
Oct 15	Hurdle 3300 m (Good)	Tokyo High Jump	J-GII	Tokyo	7.2 (4th)	14	6th	3:43.6	Yuzo Shirahama	1.3	Majesty Bio	
Nov 12	Hurdle 3170 m (Firm)	Kyoto Jump Stakes	J-GIII	Kyoto	5.0 (3rd)	11	1st	R3:30.4	Yuzo Shirahama	–0.1	(El Junction)	
2012 – six-year-old season
Jan 14	Hurdle 3170 m (Firm)	Ushiwakamaru Jump Stakes	Open	Kyoto	1.6 (1st)	14	1st	3:31.4	Yuzo Shirahama	–0.4	(Kanes Raphael)	
Feb 4	Hurdle 3100 m (Firm)	Haru Urara Jump Stakes	Open	Tokyo	3.2 (2nd)	14	13th	3:32.7	Yuzo Shirahama	3.6	Dia Majesty	
Apr 15	Dirt 2400 m (Firm)	4-Y-O Allowance	Allowance	Fukushima	14.4 (6th)	16	14th	2:39.4	Kohei Matsuyama	2.2	Bandam Mirage	
May 12	Hurdle 3930 m (Firm)	Kyoto High Jump	J-GII	Kyoto	4.6 (2nd)	12	2nd	4:21.7	Yuzo Shirahama	0.1	M. S. World	
Jul 28	Hurdle 3390 m (Firm)	Kokura Summer Jump	J-GIII	Kokura	2.7 (1st)	14	2nd	3:41.4	Yuzo Shirahama	0.5	M. S. World	
Sep 15	Hurdle 3140 m (Firm)	Hanshin Jump Stakes	J-GIII	Hanshin	6.4 (4th)	12	1st	R3:25.6	Shigefumi Kumazawa	–0.2	(Narita Shuttle)	
Nov 10	Hurdle 3170 m (Firm)	Kyoto Jump Stakes	J-GIII	Kyoto	1.5 (1st)	8	DNF	–	Shigefumi Kumazawa	–	Masano Blues	
2013 – seven-year-old season
Jan 19	Hurdle 3170 m (Firm)	Ushiwakamaru Jump Stakes	Open	Kyoto	1.7 (1st)	14	1st	3:32.1	Yuzo Shirahama	–0.3	(Cosmo Soyuz)	
Mar 9	Hurdle 3900 m (Firm)	Hanshin Spring Jump	J-GII	Hanshin	3.4 (3rd)	12	DNF	–	Yuzo Shirahama	–	Shigeru Juyaku	
May 12	Hurdle 3930 m (Firm)	Kyoto High Jump	J-GII	Kyoto	2.0 (1st)	12	1st	4:23.5	Shigefumi Kumazawa	–0.5	(High Roller)	
Sep 14	Hurdle 3140 m (Firm)	Hanshin Jump Stakes	J-GIII	Hanshin	2.5 (1st)	14	2nd	3:25.1	Shigefumi Kumazawa	0.3	Osumi Moon	
2014 – eight-year-old season
Mar 15	Hurdle 3900 m (Firm)	Hanshin Spring Jump	J-GII	Hanshin	6.2 (3rd)	12	8th	4:27.9	Shigefumi Kumazawa	4.2	Keiai Dosojin	

- R indicates a track record.

== Post-racing career ==
Following his retirement, T. M. Harrier became a riding horse at Keihoku Ikusei Bokujo in Ukyo-ku, Kyoto.

== Pedigree ==
Pedigree of T. M. Harrier (JPN)
Sire New England (JPN) 1997	Sunday Silence (USA); 1986	Halo	Hail to Reason
Sire New England (JPN) 1997	Sunday Silence (USA); 1986	Halo	Cosmah
Sire New England (JPN) 1997	Sunday Silence (USA); 1986	Wishing Well	Understanding
Sire New England (JPN) 1997	Sunday Silence (USA); 1986	Wishing Well	Mountain Flower
Sire New England (JPN) 1997	Crown Forest (USA); 1990	Chief's Crown	Danzig
Sire New England (JPN) 1997	Crown Forest (USA); 1990	Chief's Crown	Six Crowns
Sire New England (JPN) 1997	Crown Forest (USA); 1990	Playmate	Buckpasser
Sire New England (JPN) 1997	Crown Forest (USA); 1990	Playmate	Intriguing
Dam Feriado (JPN) 1996	Stately Don (USA); 1984	Nureyev	Northern Dancer
Dam Feriado (JPN) 1996	Stately Don (USA); 1984	Nureyev	Special
Dam Feriado (JPN) 1996	Stately Don (USA); 1984	Dona Ysidra	Le Fabuleux
Dam Feriado (JPN) 1996	Stately Don (USA); 1984	Dona Ysidra	Matriarch
Dam Feriado (JPN) 1996	Yukiguni (USA); 1986	Caro	Fortino
Dam Feriado (JPN) 1996	Yukiguni (USA); 1986	Caro	Chambord
Dam Feriado (JPN) 1996	Yukiguni (USA); 1986	Delicate Ice	Icecapade
Dam Feriado (JPN) 1996	Yukiguni (USA); 1986	Delicate Ice	Damascene

- T. M. Harrier is inbred 4 × 5 to Northern Dancer and 5 × 5 × 5 to Nearctic.
- His half-sister T. M. Precure (by Paradise Creek) won the Hanshin Juvenile Fillies (GI) in 2005 and was named the 2005 JRA Award for Best Two-Year-Old Filly.
- His half-brother Meiner Fiesta (by Symboli Kris S) won the Kyoto Jump Stakes (J-GIII).

== See also ==
- Thoroughbred racing in Japan
- Kyoto High Jump
