= Rosalind Creasy =

Horticulturalist and writer (born 1939)

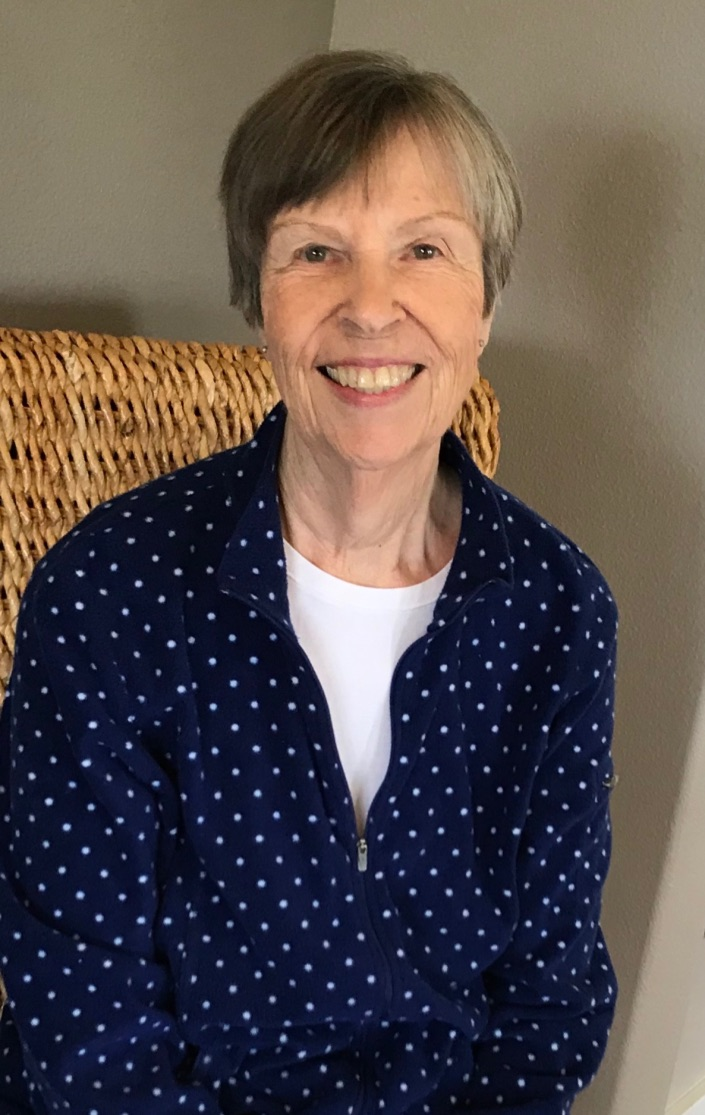
- Born: 1939 (age 86–87); Needham, Massachusetts, U.S.
- Occupations: Horticulturalist; landscape designer; author; photographer
- Website: rosalindcreasy.com

Rosalind Creasy (born 1939) is an American horticulturalist, landscape designer, and author. She is known for her work on edible landscaping, particularly her 1982 book The Complete Book of Edible Landscaping, considered a landmark book in the subject.

== Biography ==
Rosalind Creasy grew up in Needham, Massachusetts. In 1967, she moved to the San Francisco Bay Area where she began studying landscape design at Foothill College. She earned her degree in horticulture, and initially worked in landscape design using plants she describes as 'non-edible'. She moved to Los Altos, California, in 1973 to do landscape design. She first came to think about edible landscaping when she and her husband visited an Israeli kibbutz in the late 1970s where she saw the energy that went into building crop land in Israel. She felt that if Americans were growing edible plants it would be a better use of land. Back in Los Altos, she removed her front lawn and replaced it with a vegetable garden in the early 1980s; the plants in her garden include wheat that local children help her thresh and she uses to bake bread.

In 1982, Rosalind published her book The Complete Book of Edible Landscaping. After she published her first book, she traveled to different parts of the United States to introduce people to edible landscaping. The second edition of her book, Edible Landscaping, was published in 2010 and was a complete re-write given the changes since the first publication of the book in 1982.

== Awards and honors ==
Her books Edible Landscaping and Cooking from the Garden have both won the Quill & Trowel award from the Garden Writers Association. In 1999, Rosalind was named a fellow of Garden Communications International, and in 2009, she was elected to their Hall of Fame.

== Selected publications ==
- Creasy, Rosalind (2024). Adventures with Mr. X An X-traordinary Rooster!. Chelsea Green Publishing, Inc. ISBN 978-0-9615848-5-6
- Creasy, Rosalind (2010). Edible Landscaping. Catapult. ISBN 978-1-57805-154-0.
- Creasy, Rosalind (1999). The Edible Flower Garden (1st ed.). Boston: Periplus Editions. ISBN 962-593-293-3. OCLC 39713714.
- Creasy, Rosalind (1999). The Edible Heirloom Garden (1st ed.). Boston, Mass.: Periplus Editions. ISBN 962-593-294-1. OCLC 39748087.
- Creasy, Rosalind (1992). Cooking from the garden. [Place of publication not identified]: Perseus Distribution. ISBN 0-87156-588-9. OCLC 232659756.
- Creasy, Rosalind (1982). The complete book of edible landscaping – via www.worldcat.org.
