= Dyn (company) =

Former Internet infrastructure company

Dyn, Inc.
- Type: Private
- Founded: 2001; 25 years ago
- Founders: Tom Daly; Jeremy Hitchcock; Chris Reinhardt; Tim Wilde
- Defunct: February 2, 2017
- Fate: Acquired by Oracle Corporation, becoming the Oracle Dyn Global Business Unit
- Headquarters: Manchester, New Hampshire, U.S.
- Key people: Colin Doherty (CEO); Kyle York (CSO)
- Products: Internet intelligence, data traffic management, domain registration, dynamic DNS, geodns, web application security
- Website: account.dyn.com

Dyn, Inc. (/ˈdaɪn/) was an Internet performance management company that also dealt with web application security, offering products to monitor, control, and optimize online infrastructure, and also domain registration services and email products. The company was acquired by Oracle Corporation in 2016. It began operating as a global business unit of Oracle in 2017.

== History ==
Dyn was created as a community-led student project by Tim Wilde during his undergraduate studies at Worcester Polytechnic Institute. Eventually, Wilde, the founder, brought in Jeremy Hitchcock and Tom Daly as partners. Dyn enabled students to access lab computers and print documents remotely. The project then moved toward Domain Name System (DNS) services. The first iteration was a free donation-based dynamic DNS service known as DynDNS. The project required $25,000 to stay open and raised over $40,000.

The donation-based model continued until 2002 and ended with a launch of "donator-only" DNS services. Later, a premium service called the DynECT Managed DNS Platform became available in 2008, with the hiring of Kyle York, Gray Chynoweth and Cory von Wallenstein, as the business began to scale.

=== Pre-acquisition (2011–2015) ===
- 2011: Dyn opened an office in London, and eventually moved its EMEA headquarters to Brighton. In the same year, Dyn opened new headquarters in Manchester, New Hampshire, United States.
- October 2012: Dyn completed a Series A round of venture capital funding totaling US$38 million from North Bridge Venture Partners. Prior to the investment from North Bridge, the company had been self-funded.
- August 2013: Dyn launched its annual geek summer camp event, a business conference for the Internet performance industry.
- April 2014: Dyn announced the discontinuation of its free hostname services effective May 7.
- September 2014: Dyn Internet Intelligence, a SaaS-based product, was launched.

=== 2016 attack ===
On October 21, 2016, Dyn's networks were attacked three times with a distributed denial-of-service attack, causing major sites including Twitter, Reddit, GitHub, Amazon.com, Netflix, Spotify, RuneScape, Quora, and Dyn's own website to become unreachable via the URL (although most sites may have been available via IP address manually or through a maintained hosts file).

=== Acquisition by Oracle ===
- May 2016: Dyn obtained further equity funding of $50 million from Pamplona Capital Management; total funding was $100 million. The company had scaled to approximately $100 million in annual recurring revenue prior to its acquisition by Oracle. Dyn launched its platform for Internet performance management.
- October 2016: Colin Doherty was appointed the company's CEO.
  Oracle Dyn Global Business Unit
  - Type: Division
  - Founded: 2017; 9 years ago
  - Headquarters: Nashua, New Hampshire, U.S.
  - Products: Internet intelligence, data traffic management, domain registration, dynamic DNS, geodns, web application security
  - Website: oracle.com/dyn
- November 21, 2016: Dyn announced that it had agreed to be acquired by Oracle Corporation.
- June 2018: Oracle released the Internet Intelligence Map, a free tool that provides data about worldwide Internet traffic and disruptions. The map uses the Internet Intelligence technology Oracle acquired from Dyn.
- June 2019: Oracle announced Dyn's Managed and Standard DNS services would be shutting down in May 2020; this date was later extended to May 31, 2023.
  - The email sent to Standard DNS customers informed them that the Standard DNS service would be replaced by the "enhanced, paid subscription version" hosted on Oracle Cloud Infrastructure (OCI). Several customers publicly shared that they would not be migrating to OCI. In addition, a large number of Dyn's Manchester, New Hampshire employees were laid off, and the office space was put up for rent by the building owner. Many people were upset about this, including early Dyn adopters who were receiving "free for life" Standard DNS service, which was no longer being honored as of the transition to OCI DNS. "We truly appreciate your support throughout the years. While we are discontinuing the availability of services received at no cost, you may be surprised by how affordable the DNS service is within OCI along with outstanding capabilities with this service."

== Dyn acquisitions ==
- 2010: EveryDNS, EditDNS, and SendLabs
- September 2012: the search engine optimization, search engine marketing, and ecommerce development parts of Incutio LTD, plus longtime DNS provider TZO.com
- January 2, 2013: web performance monitoring company Verelo
- May 13, 2013: mobile dashboard app startup Trendslide
- December 23, 2013: ReadyStatus, a tool that notifies customers of planned and unplanned service interruptions
- March 26, 2014: Nettica, a U.S.-based managed DNS provider
- May 20, 2014: Renesys, a specialist in monitoring the Internet to provide data about cloud services, connectivity and potential performance issues
- February 15, 2018: Oracle announced an agreement to acquire Zenedge, a Florida-based web application security company. The acquisition closed on March 5, 2018, and Zenedge became part of the Oracle Dyn Global Business Unit.

== See also ==
- DNS hosting service
- Public recursive name servers
- Dynamic DNS
- List of managed DNS providers
