= Verelo =

Canadian service company

Verelo, originally based in Toronto, Ontario, Canada and acquired by infrastructure as a service company Dyn in January 2013, was a website monitoring service that tracks a website's uptime, downtime, and performance. Verelo monitored websites from multiple locations globally so that it could distinguish actual downtime from routing and access problems. Verelo argued that downtime can be costly and even take lives, and is now based in Manchester, New Hampshire, USA.

Andrew McGrath (chief executive officer) and Michael Curry (chief technology officer) founded Verelo in March 2012 upon being accepted to the newly formed Toronto-based incubator Extreme Startups.

In 2014 Verelo was rolled in the Dyn service offering and no longer exists as a stand-alone service provider.
