= Richard Ulevitch =

Richard Ulevitch is professor of immunology and Chairman Emeritus of the Department of Immunology at The Scripps Research Institute. His career is marked by a number of seminal scientific discoveries in the field of innate immunity. These include the identification of LPS binding protein, an analysis of the biological function of CD14 and the discovery of p38 MAP kinase.

Ulevitch has also been affiliated with multiple Life Science investment funds including The Lombard Odier Immunology Fund (Geneva, Switzerland), Aravis Ventures (Zurich, Switzerland) and 5AM Ventures (San Francisco/Boston) where he is currently a Venture Partner Emeritus. In addition he has served as an advisor to multiple scientific agencies including the NIH, FDA and American Heart Association. Richard is married to Susan, and is the father of David Ulevitch and Annie Ulevitch. He resides in La Jolla, California and has been an active Board member of community organizations including the La Jolla Playhouse and San Diego Opera.

== Selected bibliography ==
- Aderem, A. and Ulevitch, R.J. Toll-like receptors in the induction of the innate immune response. Nature 406:782-787, 2000.
- Arbibe, L., Mira, J.-P., Kline, L., Godowski, P.J., Ulevitch, R.J. and Knaus, U.G. Tolllike receptor 2-mediated NF-κB activation requires a Rac1-dependent pathway. Nature Immunol. 1:533-540, 2000.
- Werts, C., Tapping, R.I., Mathison, J.C., Chuang, T.-H., Kravchenko, V. V., Saint Girons, I., Haake, D., Godowski, P.J., Hayashi, F., Ozinsky, A.,. Underhill, D., Aderem, A., Tobias, P.S. and Ulevitch, R.J. Leptospiral endotoxin activates cells via a TLR2dependent mechanism. Nature Immunol. 2:346-352, 2001.
- Ge, B., Gram, H., Di Padova, F., Huang, B., New, L., Ulevitch, R., Luo Y., and Han, J. MAP kinase-independent activation of p38a mediated by TAB 1-dependent autophosphorylation of p38a. Science 295:1291-1294, 2002.
