= EveryDNS =

EveryDNS.net was one of the world's largest free DNS management services, at one time providing DNS services for over 135,000 domains, for over a decade, ending in 2011.

== History ==
EveryDNS was founded in June 2001 by David Ulevitch. On January 7, 2010, EveryDNS was purchased by Dyn Inc.

EveryDNS's web site was shut down on August 31, 2011 and all EveryDNS services were retired on September 9, 2011. Existing users were offered the opportunity to migrate over to equivalent services at Dyn Inc. starting 90 days prior to August 31, 2011.

== Services ==
EveryDNS offered services to webmasters who do not maintain their own Domain Name Services or who wished to use EveryDNS as a backup to their existing implementations. EveryDNS also offered dynamic DNS resolution, AXFR service, and domain2web redirection. EveryDNS supported SPF TXT records for donators.

== Backup services ==
Because of the danger of a distributed-denial-of-service attack on a domain name server, many companies outsource their domain name service management to companies such as Akamai. EveryDNS allows webmasters to use their servers for geographically distributed DNS service for free.

== Backend ==
EveryDNS runs on an implementation of Daniel J. Bernstein's TinyDNS. EveryDNS uses MySQL and Perl to manage TinyDNS's hash tables. PHP is used to render the user interface, with information out of the MySQL backend database.

== Wikileaks.org controversy ==
On December 2, 2010, EveryDNS dropped WikiLeaks from its entries, citing DDoS attacks that "threatened the stability of its infrastructure". Everydns.com made the following public statement:

First, let’s be clear, this is a difficult issue to deal with and there are opinions on all sides. Second, EveryDNS.net, the world’s largest free managed DNS provider, is not taking a position on the content hosted on the wikileaks.org or wikileaks.ch website, it is following established policies so as not to put any one EveryDNS.net user’s interests ahead of any others. Lastly, regardless of what people say about the actions of EveryDNS.net, we know this much is true - we believe in our New Hampshire state motto, Live Free or Die.

... At 10PM EST, on Wednesday December 1, 2010 a 24-hour termination notification email was sent to the email address associated with the wikileaks.org account. In addition to this email, notices were sent to Wikileaks via Twitter and the chat function available through the wikileaks.org website.

Any downtime of the wikileaks.org website has resulted from its failure to, with plentiful advance notice, use another DNS solution.

Yesterday, pursuant to the EveryDNS.net Acceptable Use Policy the primary DNS hosted domains were disabled. Today, also in accordance with the EveryDNS.net Acceptable Use Policy, the secondary DNS hosted domains, including wikileaks.ch, were disabled.

EveryDNS.net is not taking a position on the content hosted on the wikileaks.org or wikileaks.ch website, it is following established policies. No one EveryDNS.net user has the right to put at risk, yesterday, today or tomorrow, the service that hundreds of thousands of other websites depend on.

== See also ==
- No-IP
- DynDNS
