= Jeremy Hitchcock =

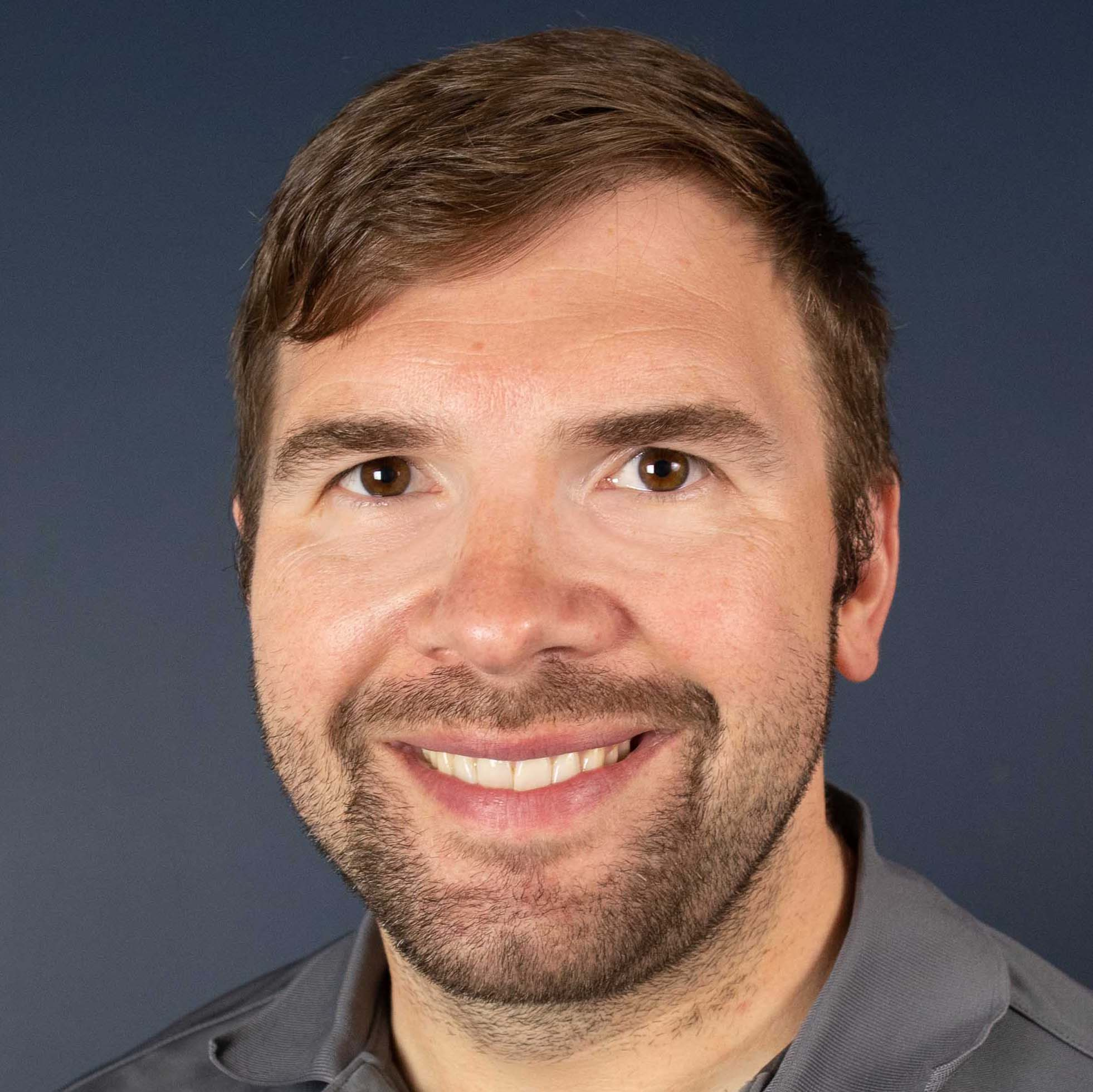
- Born: September 11, 1981 (age 44); Rochester, New York, US
- Education: Worcester Polytechnic; Institute (BS)
- Occupation: Venture capitalist
- Title: Co-Founder New North Ventures; Co-founder and Former Chief Executive Officer of Dyn

Jeremy Hitchcock (born September 11, 1981) is co-founder and CEO of wifi management and IoT security startup, Minim (NASDAQ: MINM), based in Manchester, NH. Jeremy is also a Partner at New North Ventures, which invests in artificial intelligence, cyber security and communication sectors.

== Early life ==
Hitchcock was born in Rochester, New York and grew up in Bedford, New Hampshire. After graduating from Manchester’s West High School Hitchcock attended Worcester Polytechnic Institute (WPI), graduating with a BS in Management Information Systems.

Hitchcock began his academic career at WPI by studying chemistry but in his sophomore year, he teamed up with fellow students Tim Wilde, Chris Reinhardt and Tom Daly to work on a remote access project. This project became known as Dyn.

== Career ==
=== Dyn ===
Hitchcock started Dyn in his dorm room at Worcester Polytechnic in 2001 and led the Internet performance management company from its headquarters in Manchester, N.H. upon graduation, bootstrapping it for more than 10 years before raising its first funding, a $38 million Series A in 2012 from North Bridge Venture Partners. Hitchcock resigned from the business in May 2016 prior to the Oracle acquisition, which officially closed on January 31, 2017.

=== Wikileaks & the Mirai Botnet DDoS Attack ===
In late December 2010, Dyn made international news when they chose no longer direct traffic to controversial website Wikileaks.org. At the time, Wikileaks was under intense international scrutiny over its disclosure of classified U.S. diplomatic cables and had become the focus of cyberattacks. After consulting with coworkers, customers, and industry experts, Hitchcock made the difficult decision to sever ties with the group, citing its threat to the other 500,000 websites that use its free service.

In October 2016, Dyn was again in the news after they were at the center of the largest DDoS attack using IoT devices infected with Mirai malware, which temporarily disabled parts of the internet; this caused outages at Twitter, Comcast, Spotify, and Visa, among other major platforms.

=== Minim ===
Seeing how vulnerable Dyn was after the botnet attacks Jeremy co-founded Minim, an AI-driven WiFi management and Internet of Things (IoT) security platform for service providers.

== Philanthropy ==
Hitchcock served as former Chair of the Board of Manchester Moves, a volunteer organization working to connect the City of Manchester to the rest of the state via rail trails and greenways. The Hitchcock family also makes charitable donations to the New Hampshire Food Bank and Families in Transition. With his family, Jeremy established the donor-advised Hitchcock Family Fund through the New Hampshire Charitable Foundation, which provides financial support to a range of organizations including several children’s charities.

Co-Chair for the Workforce Development Committee at the New Hampshire Tech Alliance [9]. He also formerly served as trustee to the Community College System of New Hampshire.

Jeremy was a leading voice behind the pioneering STEAM Ahead NH initiative that is modernizing public education in New Hampshire. [11]

== Other Projects and Investments ==
Jeremy started and operated an independent bookstore, Bookery in Manchester, New Hampshire.

The Hitchcocks also serve as principals to Orbit Group, providing venture capital and private equity opportunities for community-building enterprises and economic development initiatives in Manchester, New Hampshire.

Hitchcock serves as a trustee of his Alma Mater Worcester Polytechnic Institute, where he was 2015 Innovator of the Year.

Hitchcock is an active angel investor, some of the startups that he has invested in include Desktop Metal, Customter.io, and Deice, among others.

With Brett Davis, Hitchcock started venture firm New North Ventures, which invests in companies that also serve in the national interest.

== Awards & Honors ==
WPI’s 2015 Innovator of the Year Award

2016 Ernst and Young Entrepreneur of the Year Finalist

Deloitte Technology's Fast 500 ranking in 2013 and 2015

UNH’s 2019 Paul J. Holloway Entrepreneur of the Year Award

New Hampshire 200 (2021)

Recipient of New Hampshire The Walter R. Peterson Education and Public Service Award 2022

Hitchcock has also been recognized with an honorary doctorate from the University System of New Hampshire and Rivier University for his effort on workforce and economic development.

He has been featured in the Wall Street Journal, Washington Post, Forbes Magazine, Politico and the Boston Globe. Hitchcock was also featured as a special guest in a February 2013 episode of webseries This Week in Startups.
