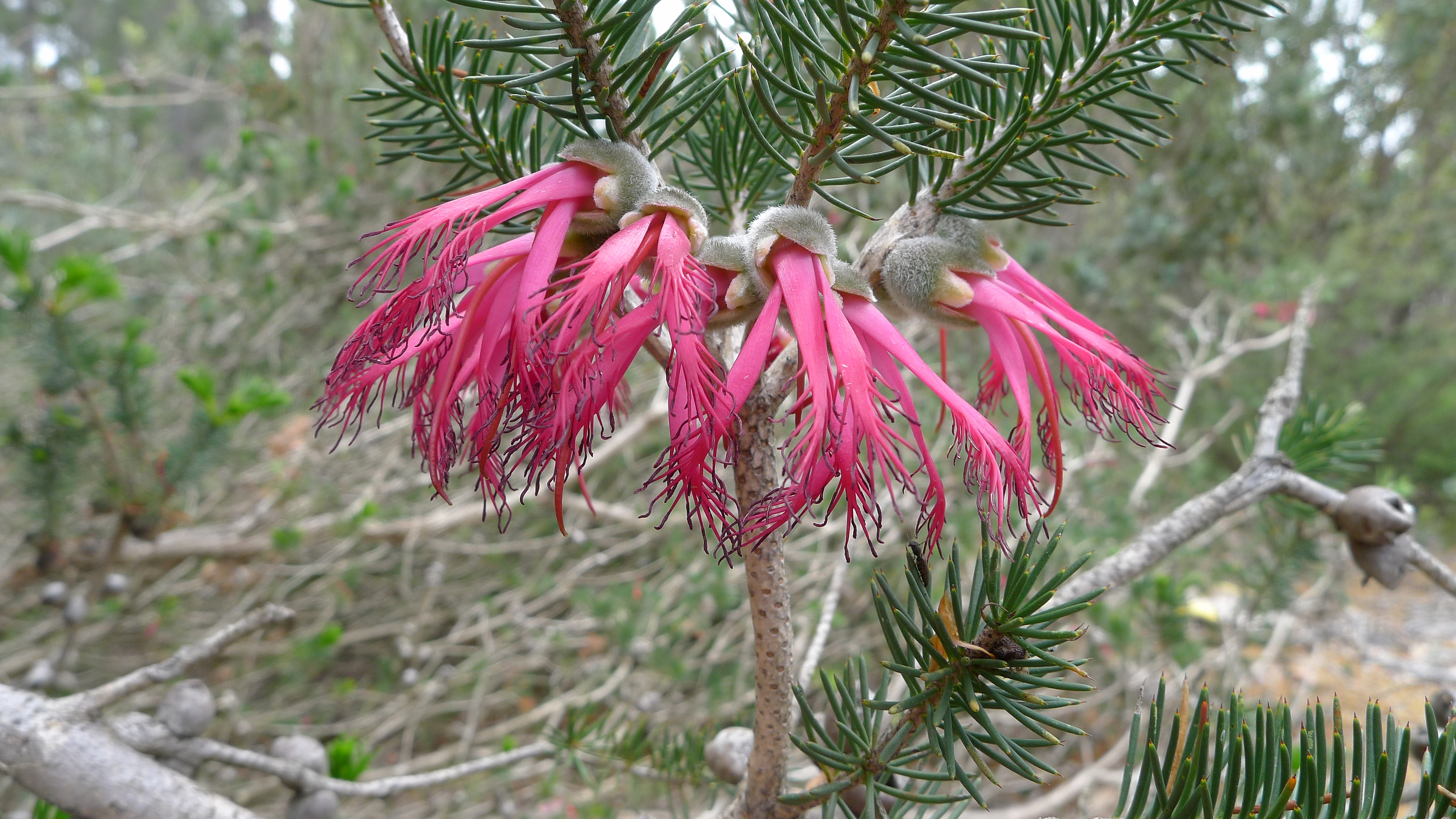
- Calothamnus rupestris in the Jarradale State Forest

Scientific classification
- Kingdom: Plantae
- Clade: Tracheophytes
- Clade: Angiosperms
- Clade: Eudicots
- Clade: Rosids
- Order: Myrtales
- Family: Myrtaceae
- Genus: Calothamnus
- Species: C. rupestris

Binomial name
- Calothamnus rupestris Schauer

Synonyms
- Melaleuca rupestris (Schauer) Craven & R.D.Edwards

= Calothamnus rupestris =

Species of flowering plant

Calothamnus rupestris, commonly known as mouse ears or granite net-bush, is a plant in the myrtle family, Myrtaceae and is endemic to the south-west of Western Australia. It is a shrub or small tree with short, stiff, prickly leaves and pink to red flowers in spring.

== Description ==
Calothamnus rupestris is an erect, often compact, sometimes spreading shrub or small tree growing to 0.9–4 metres (3–10 ft) in height. Its leaves are 20–25 millimetres (0.8–1 in) long, rigid, circular in cross section and taper to a prickly point.

The flowers are a shade of pink to red and unlike some others in the genus, are not immersed in thick, corky bark. The 4 sepals are densely hairy on their outer surface. There are 4 petals and 4 claw-like, narrow bundles of stamens. Flowering occur from July to December and is followed by fruit which are woody capsules, mostly 15–20 millimetres (0.6–0.8 in) long and 13–18 millimetres (0.5–0.7 in) wide. The fruiting capsules have four thickened lobes, two of which are prominent and beak-like.

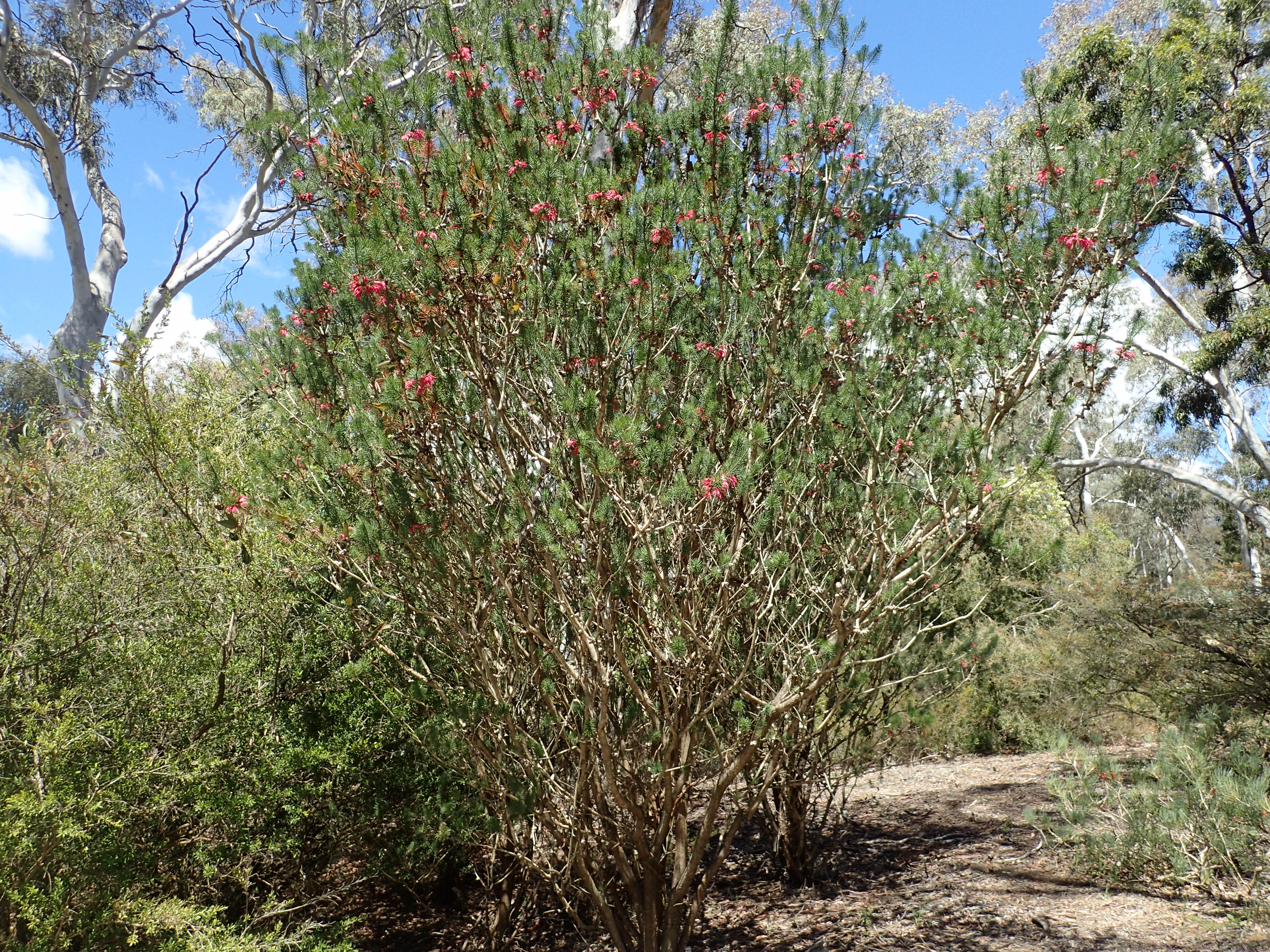
C. rupestris (labelled) in the Australian National Botanic Gardens

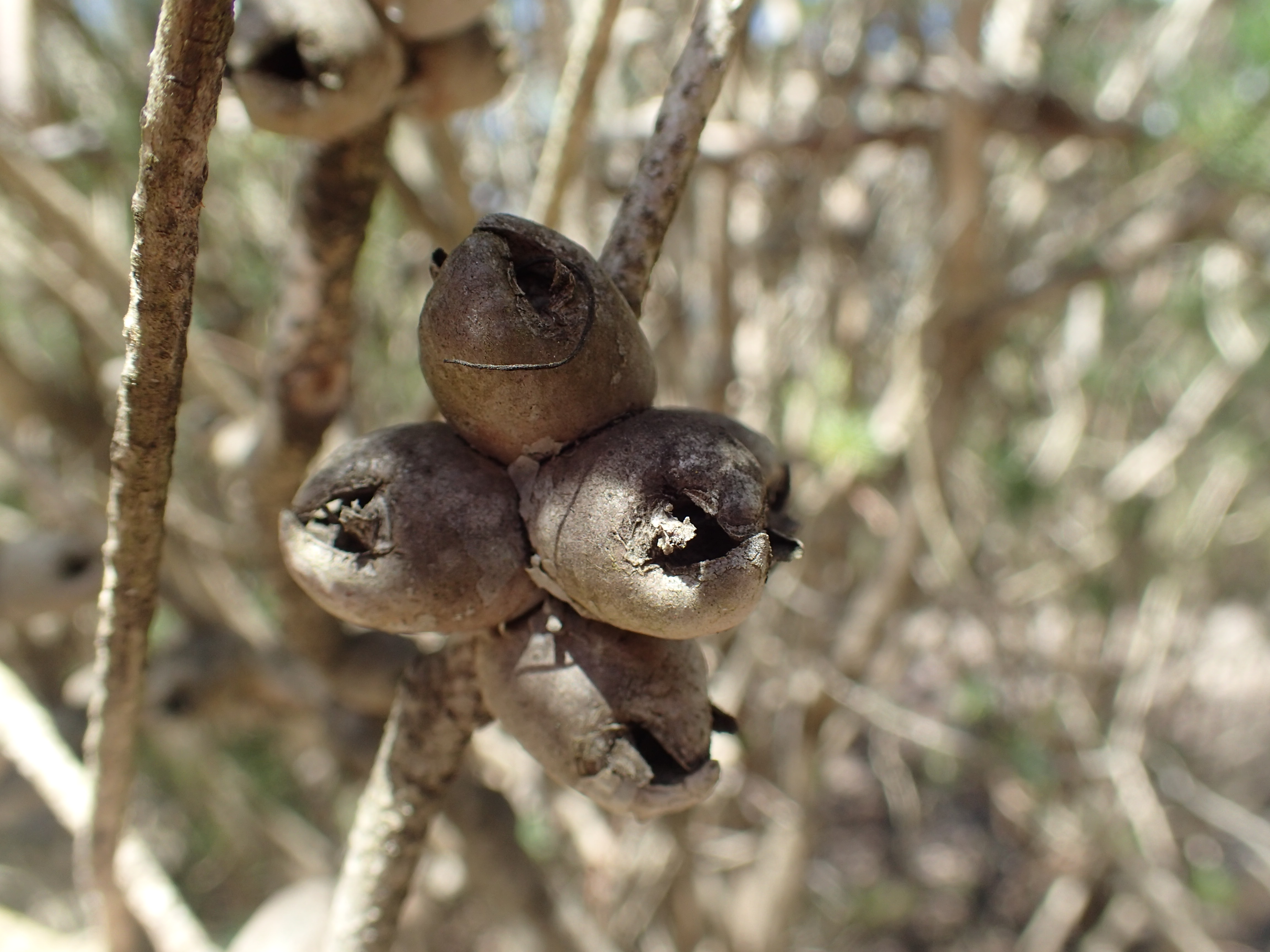
C. rupestris fruit

== Taxonomy and naming ==
The species was first formally described by Johannes Schauer in 1843 in Dissertatio Phytographica de Regelia, Beaufortia et Calothamno. The specific epithet (rupestris) is a Latin word meaning "of rocks" or "rocky".

== Distribution and habitat ==
Calothamnus rupestris is found in the Perth suburbs of Red Hill and Gosnells, the Boyagin Rock Nature Reserve and in the Avon Wheatbelt, Jarrah Forest and Swan Coastal Plain biogeographic regions. It grows on granite outcrops and hillsides.

== Ecology ==
In a study of the effect of fire on Calothamnus rupestris, it was found that the species recovers from fire using seed stored in the fruits. However, it takes 7.5 years for the plants to produce the woody capsules. More frequent, high intensity fires will therefore be lethal to populations of this species. The species' habitat on rocky outcrops means populations are protected from the effects of lower intensity burns.

== Conservation ==
Calothamnus rupestris is classified as "not threatened" by the Western Australian Government Department of Parks and Wildlife.
