= Open Garden =

Miami-based prepaid mobile roaming data MVNO

Open Garden, Inc.
- Type: Private
- Industry: Mobile virtual network operator
- Founded: San Francisco, California (2011)
- Founder: Micha Benoliel; Taylor Ongaro; Stanislav Shalunov; Greg Hazel
- Headquarters: Miami, Florida
- Services: eSIM-based prepaid mobile roaming data sales
- Number of employees: 1
- Website: opengarden.com

Open Garden, Inc. is an American mobile virtual network operator (MVNO) based in Miami, Florida, that sells eSIM-based prepaid mobile data subscriptions.

== History ==
Open Garden, Inc. was co-founded in 2011 by businessman Micha Benoliel, Internet architect Stanislav Shalunov, software developer Greg Hazel and systems architect Taylor Ongaro, in San Francisco, California in the United States.

Open Garden's website has been inaccessible since 2023. There is no evidence to suggest that the company is still in operation.

== Products ==
Between 2011 and 2015, Open Garden developed software of the same name, a proprietary internet community-based connection sharing software application that shared Internet access with other devices via Wi-Fi or Bluetooth. When the person whose Internet connection was being shared left the network, the application automatically detected and connected to the next best available connection.

After raising $2 million seed money from a group of angel investors in September 2012, Open Garden started developing and incorporating roll out multi-hop connectivity and channel bonding into their application. The new funding was led by Allan Green, an early investor in Phone.com and Mobileway, David Ulevitch, then CEO of OpenDNS, Derek Parham, creator of Google Apps for Business, and Digital Garage, which also invested in Twitter and Path. The application was free for download for Android and macOS, and at that time, Open Garden planned a freemium business model, with paid features like VPN access for business users.

== Awards and recognitions ==
Open Garden and its product were introduced on October 11, 2011 at the Android Open 2011, where they won the Startup Showcase Award. On May 26, 2012, Open Garden won the Most Innovative Startup Award at the TechCrunch Disrupt Conference 2012. Toward the end of Conference, one of the judges, venture capitalist Fred Wilson from Union Square Ventures, said that Open Garden was his favorite all along, stating that what the company does is the most worthy of the conference name - Disrupt. The following year, on October 23, 2013, Open Garden won the G-Startup Award at the Global Mobile Innovator's Conference.
