= Pizza farm =

Farm split into sections like a pizza split into slices

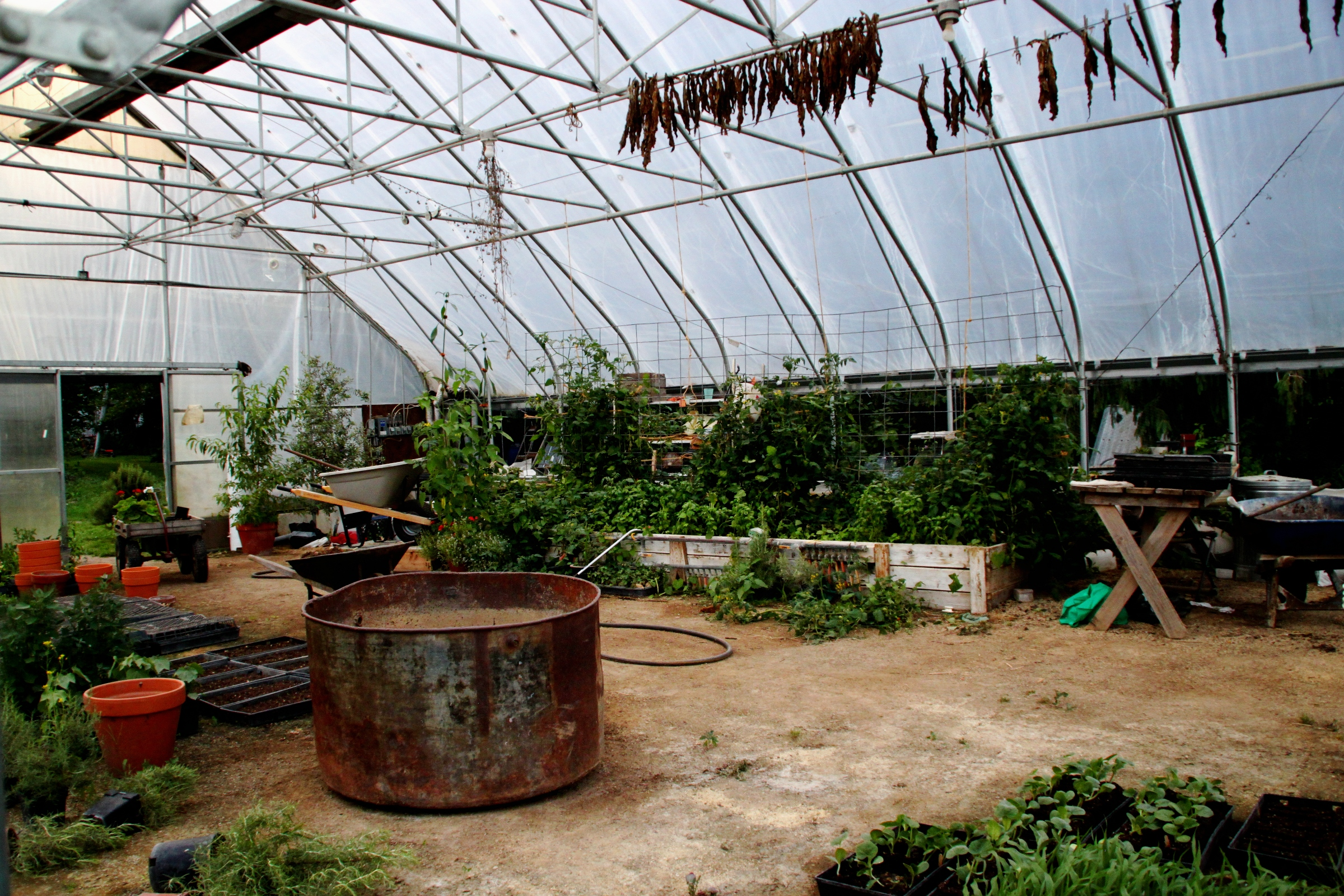
Interior of a greenhouse on a pizza farm that sells pizza

A pizza farm can be both a farm-based food-service establishment that sells pizza or a demonstration farm that educates visitors about agriculture by growing pizza ingredients, sometimes on a circular piece of land partitioned into plots shaped like pizza slices.

== Demonstration farms ==
Some pizza farms are demonstration farms that educate visitors about agriculture by growing pizza ingredients, sometimes on a circular piece of land partitioned into plots shaped like pizza slices. The farm often grows ingredients that can be used in pizza, such as wheat for the crust, tomatoes and herbs for the sauce, pork for pepperoni, dairy cows for cheese, and even trees for pizza oven firewood. Certain farms may even have access to coal or natural gas deposits that can be used as additional pizza oven heating fuels.

=== Examples of demonstration pizza farms ===
- Agriculture in the Classroom Canada has yearly student-farmed pizza farms. There are other food farms in the program, including a "burgers and fries" farm.
- The Pizza Farm at Cobb Ranch (Fresno, California)
- "R" Pizza Farm (Dow, Illinois)

== Culinary pizza farm ==
Some pizza farms are primarily farm-based food service establishments that sell pizza. Pizza farms have become popular in Minnesota, Wisconsin, and Iowa. Farms often grow or raise many of their own ingredients, similar to demonstration pizza farms.

=== Examples of culinary pizza farms ===
- A to Z Produce and Bakery (Stockholm, Wisconsin)
- Amber Waves Farm (Amagansett, New York)
- Luna Valley Farm (Decorah, Iowa)
- Pleasant Grove Pizza Farm (Waseca, Minnesota)
- Hawkins Family Farm (North Manchester, Indiana)
- Old Germantown (Germantown, Wisconsin)
