= David Ulevitch =

American executive

- Born: December 10, 1981 (age 44)
- Citizenship: American
- Education: Washington University in St. Louis
- Occupations: General Partner at Andreessen Horowitz; Founder at OpenDNS
- Known for: Enterprise software, SaaS, security, networking, privacy, DNS
- Website: david.ulevitch.com

David A. Ulevitch (born December 10, 1981) is an American entrepreneur and venture capitalist. He was the founder and CEO of the enterprise security company OpenDNS (acquired by Cisco) and founder of EveryDNS (acquired by Dyn). In December 2016, Ulevitch was named the Senior Vice President and General Manager of Cisco's Security Business. In October 2018, Ulevitch joined Andreessen Horowitz as a General Partner investing in American Dynamism, Enterprise, SaaS, National Defense, National Security, Cybersecurity, and other areas.

== Career ==
Ulevitch entered the Internet industry while in junior high school, working at San Diego area Internet service provider Electriciti, at a time when Electriciti and its president Chris Alan were founding members of Packet Clearing House, which was then building one of the first Internet exchange points, at nearby UC San Diego.

In May 2001, while a student at Washington University in St. Louis, Ulevitch created EveryDNS to fill his need for web-based DNS management software. EveryDNS grew from a personal project to a service with nearly 100,000 users worldwide within a few years. In January 2010, EveryDNS was acquired by Manchester, NH company, Dyn, Inc, who was later acquired by Oracle Corporation.

In July 2006, Ulevitch launched OpenDNS, a recursive DNS service focused on performance and security. On June 30, 2015 Cisco announced that it was buying OpenDNS for $635 million.

In October 2018, Ulevitch left Cisco Systems and joined Andreessen Horowitz as a General Partner.

In June 2019, Ulevitch joined the board of directors of AnyRoad as part of a $9.2 million investment into the company by Andreessen Horowitz.

== Awards and recognition ==
In 2014, Inc. Magazine named Ulevitch to their annual "35 Under 35" list of entrepreneurs. Ulevitch's company, OpenDNS, was selected as a World Economic Forum Technology Pioneer in 2011.
