= Exowatt =

American renewable energy company

Exowatt is an American renewable energy company based in Miami, Florida, founded in 2023 by Hannan Happi and Jack Abraham. The company designs modular thermal energy storage systems aimed at providing dispatchable renewable power, primarily targeting data centers and other energy intensive commercial applications.

Exowatt's product is the Exowatt P3, a modular solar thermal energy system that provides up to 24 hours of dispatchable power daily. The system captures solar energy using specialized lenses, stores it as heat in a long duration thermal battery, and converts it to electricity on demand using a heat engine. As of April 2025, Exowatt had raised $90 million in venture capital funding.

== History ==
Exowatt was founded in 2023 by Hannan Happi (CEO) and Jack Abraham (Chairman). Happi's background includes roles at Siemens, General Electric, and Tesla, while Abraham is also the CEO of venture studio Atomic, where Exowatt was incubated, and co-founder of other companies including Hims & Hers Health and OpenStore.

The company was created in response to growing energy demands from artificial intelligence and data centers, with the founders identifying a gap in the market for renewable energy solutions that could provide reliable baseload power. According to Happi, the company underwent multiple design iterations before settling on its thermal storage approach, with more than 50 different versions of the technology considered during early development.

The company emerged from stealth mode in April 2024, announcing a $20 million Seed funding round led by Andreessen Horowitz (a16z), Atomic, and OpenAI CEO Sam Altman. The initial funding was directed toward developing the company's modular energy platform and establishing early customer relationships. According to Katherine Boyle, General Partner at a16z, cited the company's focus on U.S. manufacturing and energy infrastructure resilience as key factors in the investment decision.

In September 2024, Exowatt publicly unveiled its P3 product at the RE+ clean energy conference in Anaheim, California. The event featured attendance by several of the company's investors, including actor Leonardo DiCaprio. By late 2024, the company reported a customer backlog exceeding 85 GWh.

In April 2025, Exowatt announced a $70 million Series A funding round led by Felicis Ventures, bringing total funding to $90 million. The Series A included $35 million in equity and $35 million in debt financing provided by HSBC Innovation Banking and other partners. Additional investors across both funding rounds included 8090 Industries, Starwood Capital, MCJ Collective, MVP Ventures, GOAT VC, StepStone Group, Climate Capital, Overmatch Ventures, Protagonist, and actor Leonardo DiCaprio. The company indicated that this funding would support commercial deployments scheduled to begin in 2025.

== See also ==
- Solar energy
- Concentrated solar power
- Thermal energy storage
- Data center
- Environmental impact of artificial intelligence
- Dispatchable generation
