= Andreessen Horowitz =

American venture capital firm

a16z Capital Management, LLC
- Trade name: Andreessen Horowitz
- Formerly: AH Capital Management, L.L.C.
- Type: Private
- Industry: Venture capital
- Founded: July 6, 2009; 17 years ago
- Founders: Marc Andreessen; Ben Horowitz
- Headquarters: Menlo Park, California, U.S.
- AUM: >US$100 billion (2026)
- Number of employees: >500 (2024)
- Website: a16z.com

Andreessen Horowitz (also known as a16z) is an American privately-held venture capital firm headquartered in Menlo Park, California, United States. It was founded in 2009 by Marc Andreessen and Ben Horowitz. The number "16" in the name comes from the letter count between the first letter in Andreessen and the last letter in Horowitz.

Andreessen Horowitz invests in both early-stage startups and established growth companies. Its investments span the healthcare, consumer, cryptocurrency, gaming, fintech, education, and enterprise software (including cloud computing, security, and software as a service) industries.

As of January 2026, the company has $90 billion in assets under management.

== Founding and partnering ==
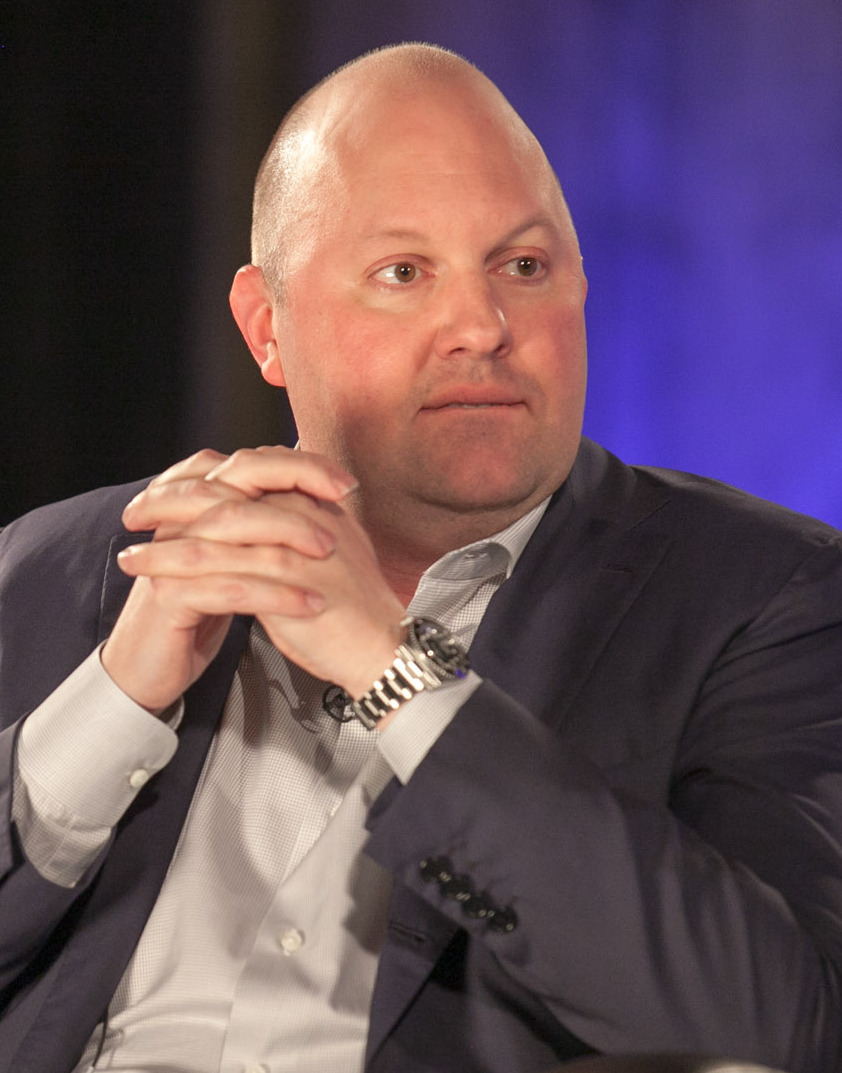
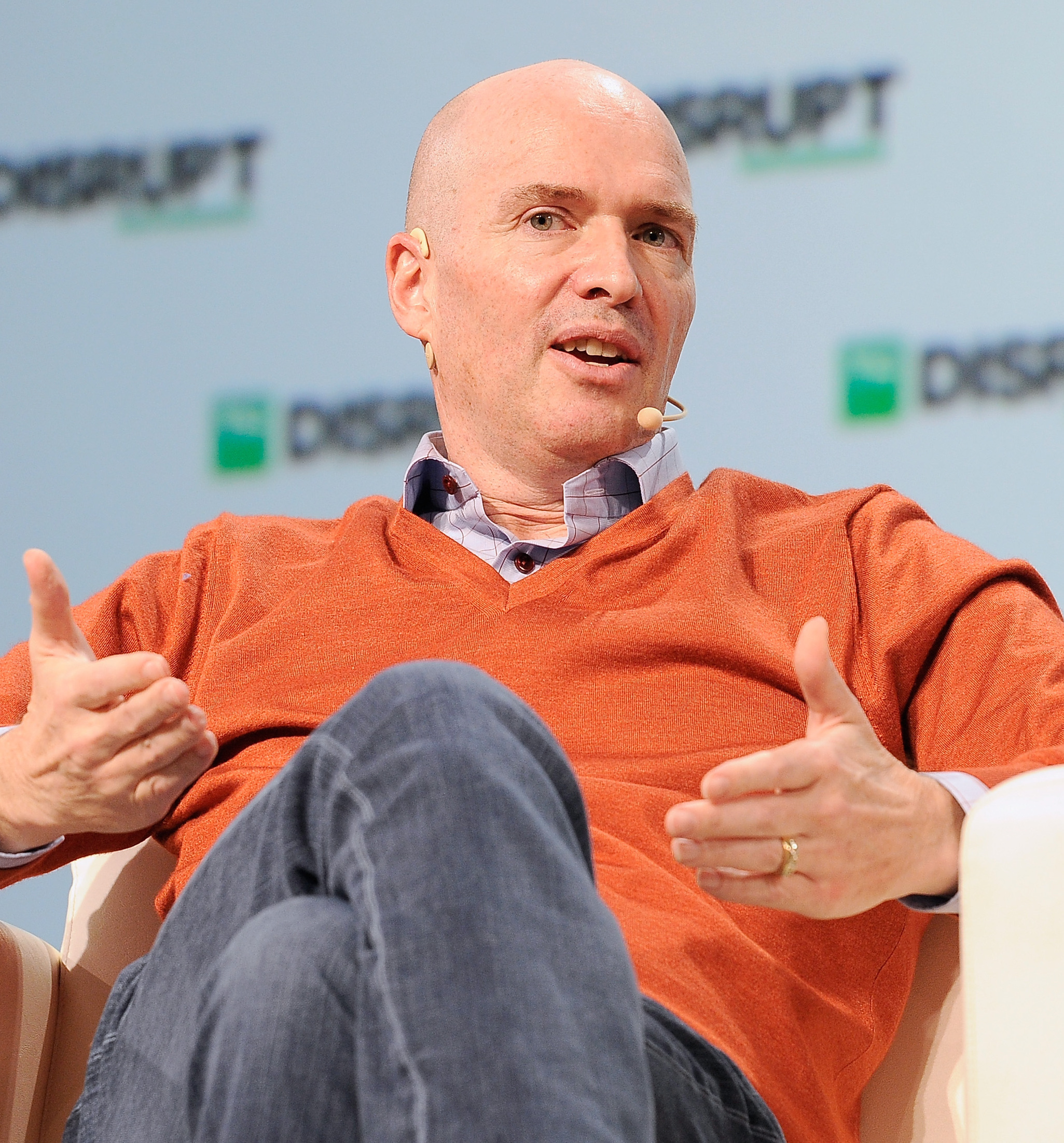
Marc Andreessen (left) and Ben Horowitz (right) are the company's founders.

Between 2006 and 2010, Marc Andreessen and Ben Horowitz actively invested in technology companies. Both separately and together, they invested $4 million in 45 startups, including Twitter. During this time, the two became known as "super angel" investors.

On July 6, 2009, Andreessen and Horowitz launched their venture capital fund with an initial capitalization of $300 million. In November 2010, at a time when the field of venture capitalism was contracting, the company raised an additional $650 million for a second venture fund. In less than two years, the firm was managing a total of $1.2 billion under the two funds.

As of March 27, 2014, the firm was managing $4 billion in assets following the closing of its fourth fund at $1.5 billion.

In addition to Andreessen and Horowitz, the firm's general partners include Jeff Jordan, Chris Dixon, Martin Casado, and Andrew Chen. Ex-VMware CEO Raghu Raghuram joined the firm as general partner in October 2025. Margit Wennmachers served as operating partner from 2010 to July 2025, when she became partner emeritus.

In March 2019, it was reported that Andreessen Horowitz was opening an office in San Francisco.

In January 2022, Andreessen Horowitz raised $9 billion for its venture capital, growth-stage, and biotech-focused funds.

In January 2026, Andreessen Horowitz raised $15 billion across five new funds.

As of March 2026, the firm is managing at least $90 billion in assets.

== Investments ==
By 2012, Business Insider wrote that, "Andreessen Horowitz is the most powerful and respected venture capital firm in Silicon Valley right now." The firm is often cited as the largest and one of the most powerful venture capital funds in the world. Marc Andreessen in particular is often cited as one of the most powerful venture capitalists, who is dominant, if also controversial, not only in Silicon Valley, but also in politics.

As per the website OfficeChai's calculations (up to October 2025), since 2020, Andreessen Horowitz has backed 32 unicorns, more than any other venture firm. By November 2025, Andreessen Horowitz's website lists 1076 portfolio companies. The note reads: "Any investments or portfolio companies mentioned, referred to, or described on this page are not representative of all investments in vehicles managed by a16z and there can be no assurance that the investments will be profitable or that other investments made in the future will have similar characteristics or results. Exits include current and former a16z portfolio companies which have been acquired as well as companies which have undergone an initial public offering or direct public offering of shares. Certain publicly traded companies on this list may still be held in Andreessen Horowitz funds." The American Dynamism section lists 50 companies.

Leslie Feinzaig writes on Fast Company that nowadays Andreessen Horowitz and other big firms do not act like traditional venture capital firms anymore, but invest beyond early-stage private companies, including public equities, crypto tokens, non-traditional assets, and more. There is also a tendency towards competing for the obvious alpha, and not just making the contrarian's bet.

Andreessen Horowitz presents their primary political agenda as defending Little Tech (startups), in contrast to Big Tech incumbents. In April 2025, together with Y Combinator and AI companies like Anyscale, Exowatt, and Sourcegraph, the firm launched American Innovators Network, a coalition that represents "America's Little Tech ecosystem leading the next era of innovation and economic growth".

John Mac Ghlionn of the Boston Globe refers to "Small Tech" and defines it as "a cluster of small Silicon Valley firms" that represents the "AI-driven military-industrial complex" with Palantir as "its public face", writing that, "The deeper roster runs through Anduril, Shield AI, Saronic, Scale AI, Vannevar Labs, Skydio, Epirus, and a dozen more startups bankrolled by the venture capital firm Founders Fund, Andreessen Horowitz, and Peter Thiel's wider network."

=== American Dynamism ===
In 2023, the firm launched a $600 million American Dynamism fund "with the broad aim of supporting companies building in the nation's interest". American Dynamism has raised two funds since its establishment, with a total value of $1.8 billion. The fund focuses on hard tech sectors which serve national interest, including space, defense, manufacturing, robotics. In 2024, Andreessen Horowitz launched the 12-month American Dynamism Engineering Fellows Program, which was intended to recruit and train technologists. Also associated with the American Dynamism fund is the annual American Dynamism summit sponsored by Andreessen Horowitz, which gathers startup founders, investors, Members of Congress and Defense Department officials. The summit is officially non-partisan and has partnered with Democratic defense officials like former Deputy Secretary of Defense Kathleen Hicks.

The fund has been managed by three general partners, namely Katherine Boyle, David Ulevitch and Erin Price-Wright. In July 2026, Connor Love was added to the team. David Ulevitch is the leader.

Boyle plays an important role in the initiative. She declares in an essay titled "Building American Dynamism" that, "I believe the only way to reverse the course of stagnation and kick-start nationwide renewal post-Covid is through technologists building companies that support the national interest." She had previously interned at Founders Fund and is influenced by Peter Thiel's thinking. In 2016, she joined General Catalyst where she helped fund Anduril, before joining Andreessen Horowitz. Her portfolio at Andreessen Horowitz includes Hadrian, Apex Space (satellites) and Castelion (hypersonic weapons).

Other notable companies supported by American Dynamism include:

- Applied Intuition: After its 2025 Series F ($600 million), its valuation reached $15 billion. Originally, its AI software focused on helping automobile companies like Toyota and Porsche in the development of their autonomous driving technology. Later the startup's defense division has increasingly applied this technology the US military, covering areas like "map aerial, maritime and land environments", also working to "simulate new ones, and use the data to improve unmanned systems". The software is also used "to coordinate attacks using autonomous drones from multiple vendors". The company is expanding into space.
- Auterion: physical AI company that focuses on software for drones.
- Astranis: company that builds geostationary satellites. Martin Casado of Andreessen Horowitz joined the board after a $13.5 million funding round in 2018. In 2023, the fund led another $200 million for Astranis. OIn 29 December 2024, four broadband spacecraft built by the company, relying on SpaceX's capacity, were successfully launched toward geostationary orbit, "marking the first time a single commercial manufacturer has flown four of its own satellites on one mission to GEO".
- Castelion: defense startup that develops hypersonic technology. Andreessen Horowitz co-led the initial funding in 2023. The fund participated in the $100 million funding round in 2025 and the $350 million Series B later that year.. In 2016, the company's Blackbeard was chosen as the contractor of the Multi-mission Affordable Capacity Effector program (developing air-launched anti-ship hypersonic missiles for the U.S. navy).
- Hadrian: defense manufacturing company, which has a close connection with Anduril. In August 2026, Andreessen Horowitz participated in its $1.37 billion Series D.
- Hermeus: The company builds hypersonic technology for defense purposes.
- Impulse Space: An orbital transfer vehicle developer, that works on space-based interceptor technology together with Anduril. Tamarack Global, a firm backed by Marc Andreessen and Chris Dixon of Andreessen Horowitz, is also a notable backer of Impulse Space.
- Northwood Space: startup that emerged from stealth mode in February 2024 and designs "satellite ground systems that receive data from satellites." Andreessen Horowitz and Founders Fund co-led the seed round in 2024. Andreessen Horowitz co-led $30 million Series A and its $100 million Series B in 2026.
- Scale AI: data annotation startup, which allies closely with Palantir and Anduril as a new industrial player in the defense sector.
- Shield AI: Peter Levine of Andreessen Horowitz sits on the board of Shield AI. In 2025, Andreessen Horowitz joined Shield AI's $240 million round as an existing investor.
- Skydio: A dronemaker backed early by Andreessen Horowitz. It became the first U.S. unicorn dronemaker in 2021.
- SpaceX: Andreessen Horowitz backed SpaceX for the first time in 2023.
- Venus Aerospace: hypersonic company that has succeeded in developed "the first-ever test flight of a rotating detonation rocket engine (RDRE) in the United States." Tamarack also backs the company.

=== Notable portfolio companies (outside American Dynamism) ===
==== Defense and dual-use ====
- Advanced Manufacturing Company of America (Amca): aerospace and defense company, that acts as a layer between startups and legacy players. It acquires old defense companies that make power units, sensors and flight-control computers to rebuild the supply chain for companies like Boeing and Airbus. The company launched in April 2025 with $76.5 million in initial funding. Backers include Founders Fund, Caffeinated Capital, Lux Capital, Andreessen Horowitz. Andreessen Horowitz continued to join the $300M Series B in April 2026.
- Databricks: In 2013, Reuters reports that Andreessen Horowitz "quietly invested $14 million in a mysterious new venture called Databricks". It is a Silicon Valley Defense Group company, alongside others like Anduril, Scale AI and Shield AI.
- Mistral AI: Andreessen Horowitz is one of the company's main backers. The company works with the French Ministry of Defense and is expanding its service towards Ukraine.
- Starcloud: startup that develops space-based data centers. Andreessen Horowitz has backed it since the seed round in 2024.

==== Artificial intelligence and software ====
- Asana: Andreessen Horowitz has supported the company since its Series A (2009).
- Cluely: AI assistant startup which is backed Andreessen Horowitz, which led a $15 million Series A for the company in 2025.
- Cursor (former Anysphere): According to Forbes, Andreessen Horowitz owns a 10% stake ($6 billion). In June 2026, SpaceX acquired Cursor, paying $60 billion entirely in SpaceX's Class A shares.
- Deel, Inc.: AI-based human resources startup. Andreessen Horowitz is its long-time backer and the fund's Anish Acharya sits on the company's board.
- ElevenLabs: AI company that works on synthetic voices. Andreessen Horowitz co-led its Series A (2023), B (2024), C (2025) and participated in the $500 million Series D (2026).
- GitHub: the software-services firm is one of Andreessen Horowitz's notable successes. In 2012, Andreessen Horowitz invested $100 million in the company — this was the largest investment the fund had ever made. Peter Levine took a board seat at the company. In 2018, while Microsoft acquired GitHub, Andreessen Horowitz got a return of over $1 billion.
- Hebbia: startup that builds a searching and answering system based on generative AI. Andreessen Horowitz led its $100 million Series B in 2024.
- Samsara: enterprise software company which was backed by Andreessen Horowitz, which led a $25 million Series A for it in 2015.
- Thinking Machines Lab: multimodal AI company founded by former OpenAI personnel and led by Mira Murati. Its $2 billion seed round led by Andreessen Horowitxz in 2025 is one of the largest seed round in the history of Silicon Valley.

==== Robotics ====
- Mind Robotics: Andreessen Horowitz co-led the $500 million Series A round with Accel.

==== Energy ====
- Exowatt: A startup that focuses on clean energy for data centers. Andreessen Horowitz and Sam Altman invested $20 million in the company in 2024.

==== Fintech and crypto ====
- Affirm Holdings: Andreessen Horowitz first backed the company in 2015 (Series B). The fund joined the Series D in 2016.
- Coinbase: Andreessen Horowitz first invested in the company in 2013 (Series B). By 2021, the fund held the biggest stake among all investors, estimated to be $9.7 billion in value. Marc Andreessen has served on the board since 2020.
- Ripple Labs: holder of XRP and creator of its payment system. Andreessen Horowitz has invested in the company since the early stage in 2013.

==== Consumer services ====
- Lyft: company that provides ride-hailing services. Ben Horowitz served on the board of the company from 2016 to 2020. By 2019, Andreessen Horowitz owned about 6 percent of the company's shares,, with a total value of the stake estimated to be $1 billion.

==== Social media ====
- Buzzfeed: In 2014, Andreessen Horowitz invest $50 million in the company, helping to put its valuation at $850 million. In December 2021, when Buzzfeed's shares hovered around $5.92, The Information calculated that Andreessen Horowitz's return on the investment was negative.
- Pinterest: Andreessen Horowitz first backed the company in 2011 (Series B). By 2019, Andreessen Horowitz owned 43.5 million shares (9.6 percent), which are worth $1.08 billion.
- Medium: Andreessen Horowitz led the Series B in 2015.
- Skype: In 2009, as a member of a buyout consortium, Andreessen Horowitz invested $50 million in the company.
- Substack: Andreessen Horowitz has supported the company since its Series A (2019).
- Doublespeed: Back by Horowitz (a16z), uses phone farms to publish AI-generated social media influencer accounts to promote products.

=== Investments by timeline ===
==== 2009 ====
In 2009, Andreessen Horowitz made its first two investments: one in business management SaaS developer Apptio and one in Skype stock.

According to Horowitz, the Skype investment was seen as risky by other experts in the field, who believed the company would be crippled by ongoing intellectual property litigation and direct competitive attacks from Google and Apple. The firm's founders viewed the investment as a success following Skype's sale to Microsoft in May 2011 for $8.5 billion.

==== 2010–2011 ====
In 2010, Andreessen Horowitz invested $10 million in the cloud company Okta, leading its Series A round.

In 2011, Andreessen Horowitz invested $80 million in Twitter, becoming the first venture firm to hold stock in all four of the highest-valued privately held social media companies at the time: Facebook, Groupon, Twitter, and Zynga.

Andreessen Horowitz also invested in Airbnb, Lytro, Jawbone, Belly, Foursquare, Stripe, and other high-tech companies.

==== 2012–2013 ====
In 2012, Andreessen Horowitz invested in 156 companies, including 90 in its portfolio and 66 startups through its funding of Y Combinator's Start Fund. The company invested $100 million in GitHub, which netted over $1 billion for the fund when Microsoft acquired GitHub for $7.5 billion. In 2013, Andreessen Horowitz invested in Clinkle, Coinbase, Databricks, Lyft, Oculus VR, PagerDuty, Pixlee, Ripple, Soylent, Swiftype, and uBiome.

==== 2014–2015 ====
In 2014, the firm led a $57 million Series B round in the A/B testing startup Optimizely. The same year, the company invested in several more companies, including Tanium for $90 million, BuzzFeed, and Forward Networks. In 2015, the firm invested $40 million in Stack Exchange, $2.8 million in Distelli, and $80 million in cloud-based CAD software company Onshape. Also in 2015, Andreessen Horowitz invested in the blogging platform Medium, Samsara, Improbable, Honor, Inc., OpenBazaar, a blockchain startup, and nootropics and biohacking company Nootrobox.

==== 2016–2019 ====
In 2016, the firm led an $8.1 million Series A round in Everlaw, a legal technology company, and led a $3.5 million Series Seed round in RapidAPI, an API connection platform for developers. Also in 2016, the firm invested $2 million in Cardiogram, a digital health company, and in Apeel Sciences, a food science business.

In 2017, the firm invested in Sigma, Health IQ, Asimov, and Cadre.

In 2018, the firm raised $300 million for a dedicated cryptocurrency fund. It also invested in Imply, Smartcar, PeerStreet, CryptoKitties, Dfinity, Earnin, Pindrop, Tenfold, and Very Good Security. In September 2018, Andreessen Horowitz participated in a Series A funding round in Applied Intuition, a software company specializing in products for autonomous vehicles (AVs), and Marc Andreessen joined the Applied Intuition board.

In 2019, the firm provided $15.3 million in Series A funding to Substack, some of which went to bringing high-profile writers onto the platform. In June 2019, the firm also invested in a $9.2 million Series A round in AnyRoad, an experiential marketing platform, and David Ulevitch from Andreessen Horowitz joined the AnyRoad board.

==== 2020 ====
In 2020, the firm led a $150 million Series G round in Roblox, a social video game platform for children.

In April 2020, the firm led a $50 million Series D round in Figma, a vector graphics editor and prototyping tool.

Also in April 2020, the firm raised $515 million for a second cryptocurrency-focused fund.

In May 2020, the firm made a $12 million Series A investment in Clubhouse ($10 million in primary capital plus $2 million toward purchasing shares), an audio-chat social networking app valued at nearly $100 million as of December 2020.

==== 2021 ====
In January 2021, the firm led a $100 million Series B for the audio-chat social networking app Clubhouse, reportedly valuing it at $1 billion. In April 2021, it led a $220 million Series D for mobile banking and fintech company Current.

In July 2021, the firm led a $100 million Series A for the NFT marketplace OpenSea, reportedly valuing it at $1.5 billion.

In July 2021, the firm announced its investment in Series D funding for Flock Safety, a public safety technology company that provides AI-enabled security cameras and crime prevention software.

In September 2021, the firm led an $18 million Series A fundraise in Pearl Health, a healthcare technology company.

In October 2021, the firm led a $150M Series B round at a $3B valuation in Vietnamese studio Sky Mavis, the developer of the crypto-based online game Axie Infinity.

In December 2021, crowdfunding platform Kickstarter received a $100 million investment from the firm's crypto fund with the expectation that it would pivot to blockchain technology. The decision to pivot backfired, alienating many of Kickstarter's users, and ended up damaging its reputation.

==== 2022 ====
In March 2022, Andreessen Horowitz led the round to raise $450 million at a $4B valuation in Yuga Labs (known for Bored Apes). In October 2022, it was reported that the U.S. Securities and Exchange Commission (SEC) was investigating Yuga Labs due to concerns that sales of their digital assets violated investment laws.

In March 2022, the firm led a $27 million Series A for Rutter, a universal API for commerce data.

In March 2022, the firm and Lux Capital co-led a $90 million round for Los Angeles–based machine-parts startup Hadrian Automation.

In April 2022, it led a $12 million Series A round for Bounce, a marketplace for consumers to access underutilized space in local businesses.

In May 2022, the firm announced the launch of its largest fund to date at $4.5 billion. The fund is set to focus on cryptocurrency and blockchain technologies. The firm said that $1.5 billion was allocated to seed investments, while the remaining $3 billion would be earmarked for venture investments.

In August 2022, the firm announced it would invest about $350 million in Flow, a real estate organization begun by WeWork founder Adam Neumann. Flow's purported aim is to create a branded product in the housing market with consistent community features, reimagining how real estate works in the U.S. The decision was met with some criticism due to Neumann's business issues during his time at WeWork.

The firm committed to $400 million in equity investment toward the acquisition of Twitter by Elon Musk that completed in October 2022. According to The Washington Post, by September 2024, the firm had lost $288 million on its Twitter investment. Andreessen Horowitz also invested in Musk's AI firm xAI, which acquired Twitter in April 2025 for $45 billion, including debt.

==== 2023 ====
Andreessen Horowitz launched the accelerator program a16z speedrun in 2023. Based in San Francisco and Los Angeles, the accelerator program initially focused on funding pre-seed gaming start-ups with investments of up to $750,000 per company. The program is named for the popular gaming term “speedrunning,” which means to finish a game as quickly as possible.

==== 2025 ====
In 2025, speedrun refocused to include start-ups in all industries. In that same year, the program increased its maximum investments from $750,000 to up to $1 million and expanded to accept more companies for each cohort (about 60 per cohort). The acceptance rate has declined to be less than 1%. In addition to funding, awardees are also granted access to exclusive events, networking and marketing opportunities, and credit to select software to build their business. Andreessen Horowitz has also stated a vested interest in continuing relationships with members as they grow, and has provided increased funding for former cohort members following their time in speedrun.

==== 2026 ====
In April 2026, the company co-led a $100 million investment round in Stipple Bio, a US healthcare start-up.

In May 2026, Andreessen Horowitz invested in a $113 million series B round in OpenRouter, a US artificial intelligence company.

== Structure ==
Andreessen Horowitz partners work on behalf of all its portfolio companies, an approach modeled after the Hollywood talent agency Creative Artists Agency. In 2010, the company hired Margit Wennmachers, a marketing executive at the partner level.

As of 2011, the firm had maintained a database of designers, coders, and executives and used it to help fill positions at its startups. Former U.S. Treasury Secretary Larry Summers became a special advisor to Andreessen Horowitz in June 2011.

In 2012, former Washington D.C. mayor Adrian Fenty was appointed Andreessen Horowitz's second special advisor. Fenty was hired to advise the firm's portfolio companies on working with local, state, and federal governments.

In 2019, the firm applied to restructure as a registered investment adviser in order to have more freedom to take on riskier bets like cryptocurrency.

== Politics ==
In May 2026, Andreessen Horowitz was reported to be the largest spender in that year's US elections.
