= List of Girls characters =

Girls is an American television series created by Lena Dunham that aired on HBO from April 15, 2012, to April 10, 2017. The series centers on four young women navigating their twenties in New York City.

The show has been noted for the realistic portrayal of its characters, including the semi-autobiographical portrayal of lead character Hannah Horvath by writer, director and actress Dunham. Dunham herself told NPR that "each character was a piece of me or based on someone close to me".

According to Forbes reporter Madeline Berg, "In Girls, characters and relationships lack veneers. Whereas most television shows compel you to like their protagonists, Girls wants you to believe them." Writing in The Washington Post, Katherine Boyle compared Girls to reality TV show Keeping Up with the Kardashians, "without the witty dialogue and Golden Globe nominations". She writes, "The highbrow 'Girls' characters joke about the perils of sexting, just like the Kardashian women do. The girls mock Hannah's tiny breasts – and the camera fixates on them – in the same way the Kardashian sisters make fun of Kim's posterior."

== Cast timeline ==
Actor	Character	Seasons					
Actor	Character	1	2	3	4	5	6
Lena Dunham	Hannah Helene Horvath	Main	Main	Main	Main	Main	Main
Allison Williams	Marnie Marie Michaels	Main	Main	Main	Main	Main	Main
Jemima Kirke	Jessa Johansson	Main	Main	Main	Main	Main	Main
Zosia Mamet	Shoshanna Shapiro	Main	Main	Main	Main	Main	Main
Adam Driver	Adam Sackler	Main	Main	Main	Main	Main	Main
Alex Karpovsky	Raymond "Ray" Ploshansky	Recurring	Main	Main	Main	Main	Main
Andrew Rannells	Elijah Krantz	Recurring	Recurring	Recurring	Main	Main	Main
Ebon Moss-Bachrach	Desi Harperin	—N/a	—N/a	Recurring	Main	Main	Main
Jake Lacy	Fran Parker	—N/a	—N/a	—N/a	Recurring	Main	—N/a

== Main cast ==
=== Hannah Horvath ===
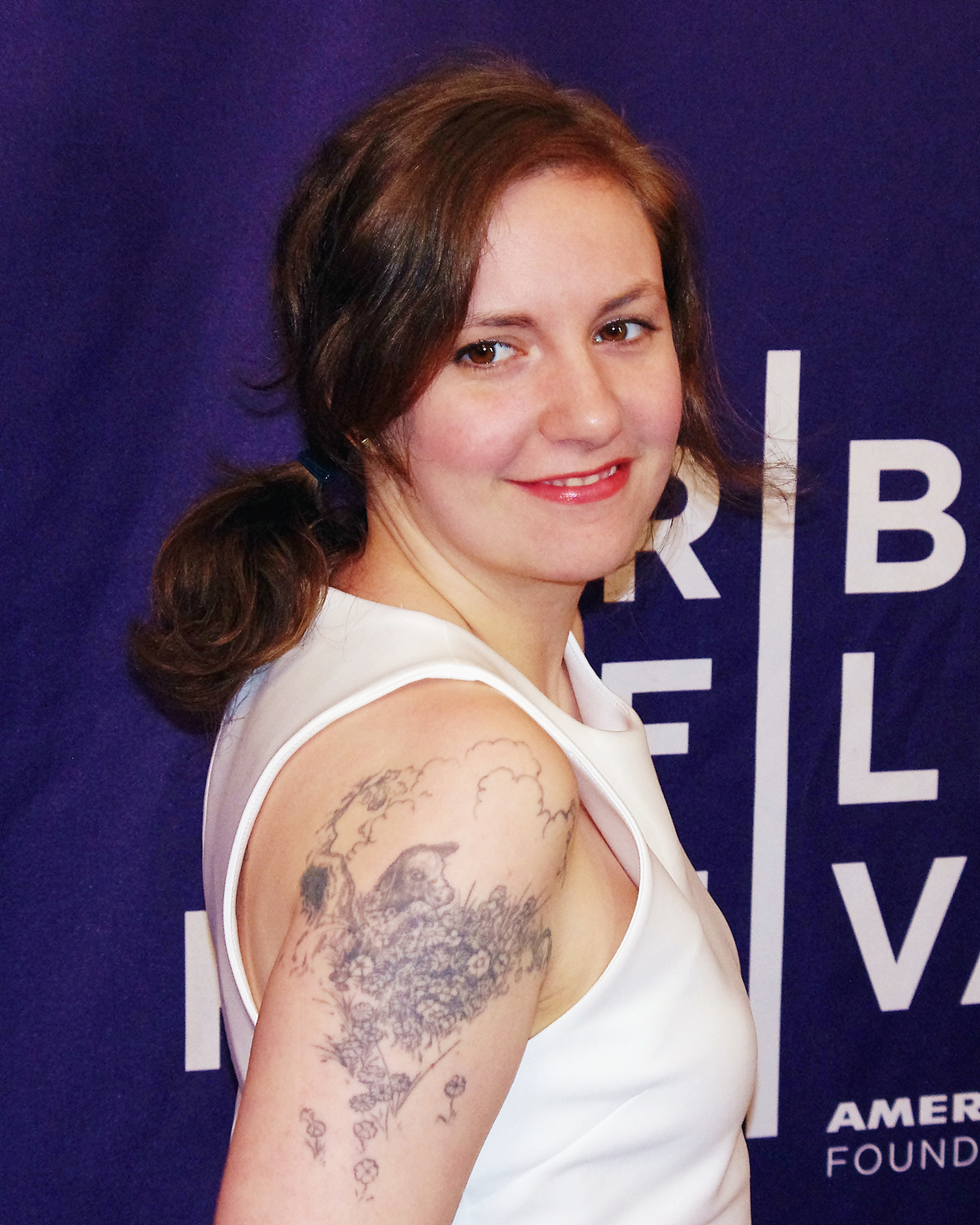
Lena Dunham

- played by Lena Dunham

Hannah Helene Horvath is an aspiring writer living in Greenpoint, Brooklyn, originally from East Lansing, Michigan. Known for her spunk and bad decisions, she struggles to support herself and find a direction in her life.

At the start of the series, Hannah's parents announce their decision to stop supporting her financially. She leaves her unpaid internship for a job at a law firm, but quits when endemic workplace sexual harassment leads to awkward misunderstanding with her boss. In season two, she is offered an e-book deal to write a series of personal essays based on the strength of her freelance contributions to online publications. The stress of the book deal causes a relapse of the obsessive–compulsive disorder symptoms she suffered in her youth, but the experience brings her closer to Adam, her on-again, off-again, love interest.

After the death of her editor causes the book deal to fall through, she takes a job writing advertorials for GQ magazine in season three. She briefly attends the Iowa Writers' Workshop in season four before returning to New York and becoming a high school teacher. There, she enters a relationship with Fran, a fellow teacher.

In the final season, Hannah becomes pregnant after a brief fling with a surf instructor during a writing assignment. She later leaves New York City to take a teaching job upstate and raise her baby.

=== Marnie Michaels ===
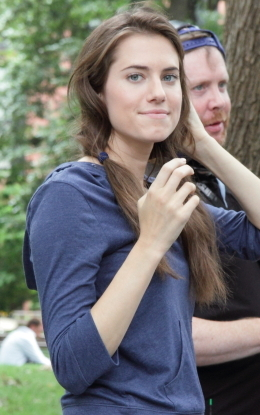
Allison Williams

- played by Allison Williams

Marnie Marie Michaels is Hannah's best friend and, at the start of season 1, roommate. Along with Jessa, Charlie and Elijah, Marnie was a classmate of Hannah's at Oberlin College. Domineering and arguably as self-centred and narcissistic as Hannah, Marnie struggles in her relationships throughout the series.

At the beginning of the show, Marnie works as an art curator in a gallery. She has been dating her college boyfriend Charlie for four years, though she has grown bored of him. They eventually break up, and Marnie is despondent when Charlie quickly begins dating someone else. Charlie is likewise upset when Marnie reveals she is dating artist Booth Jonathan. After their respective relationships end, Marnie and Charlie decide to get back together.

During the beginning of season 3, Marnie is at her emotional rock bottom. Charlie unexpectedly broke up with her, and after failing to find a job in the art world, is working at Ray's. She also begins sleeping with Ray despite their mutual animosity towards each other. After meeting musician Desi Harperin, Marnie decides to pursue her dream career in music. Despite Desi being in a relationship, he and Marnie begin a musical partnership and an affair. At the end of season 4, Desi and Marnie get engaged.

Upon returning from their honeymoon in season 5, Marnie and Desi begin arguing constantly. After an emotional reunion with Charlie, Marnie decides to divorce Desi. However, they try to continue their music partnership to ride the wave of fleeting commercial success they experience when one of their songs is featured on television. At the end of season 5, Marnie realizes that she is in love with Ray, and the two begin a relationship.

In the final season, Marnie cheats on Ray with Desi, though this affair ends when Marnie finds out that Desi is a drug addict. Sick of Marnie's self-centered attitude, Ray breaks up with her. Desi's addiction also begins to negatively affect their band, and Marnie's musical career collapses.

With nothing left for her in New York, Marnie moves upstate with Hannah to help raise her baby.

=== Jessa Johansson ===
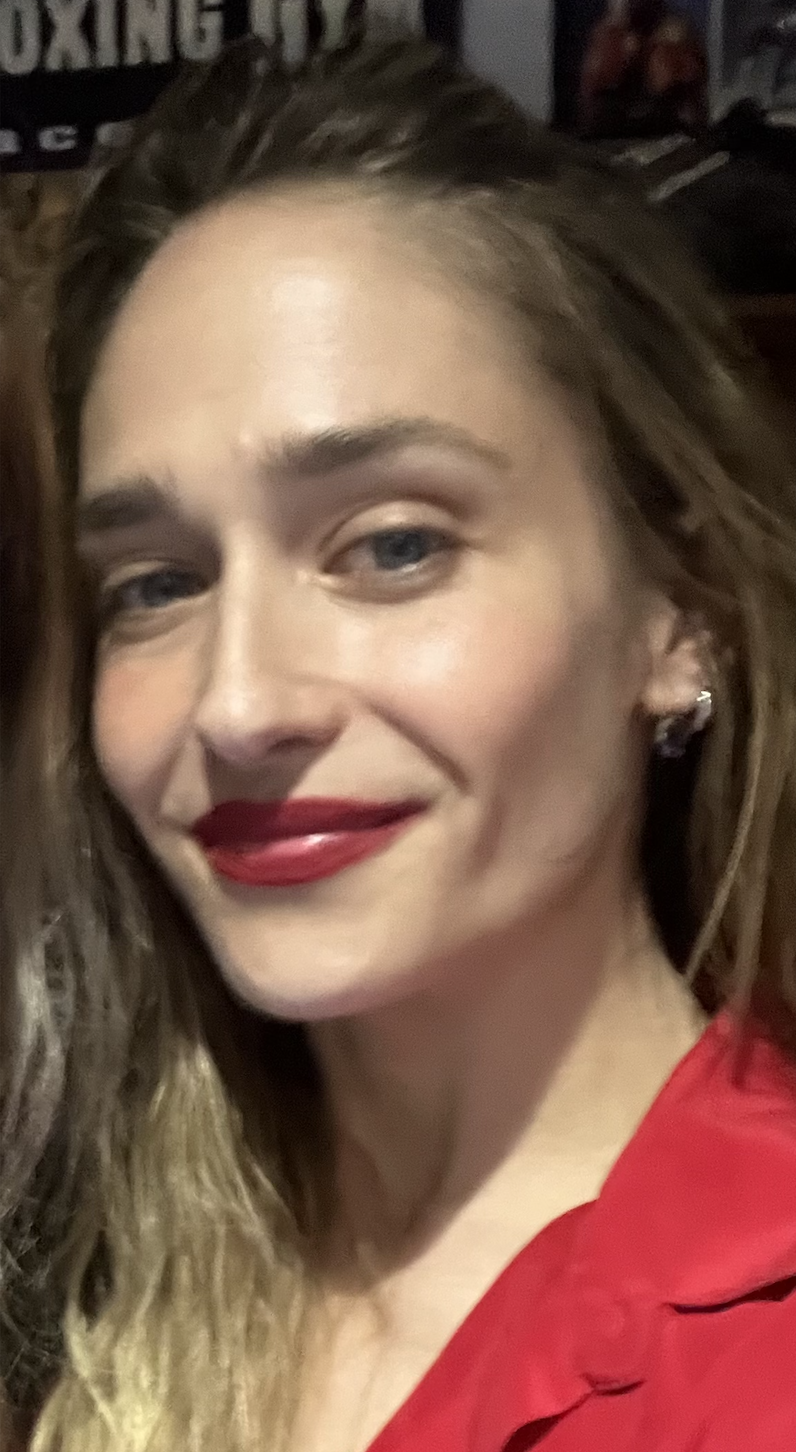
Jemima Kirke

- played by Jemima Kirke

Jessa Johansson is one of Hannah's closest friends, a global citizen of British origin, and is known for being bohemian, unpredictable, and brash. At the start of the series, Jessa has recently returned to New York from a stint abroad, and becomes roommates with her cousin, Shoshanna, in Nolita, Manhattan. She has had a turbulent relationship with her father throughout her life.

Jessa navigates many life struggles and poor choices, including a short-lived marriage to a venture capitalist named Thomas John and a stint in rehab due to heroin and cocaine addiction. In rehab, she becomes close to Jasper, an older man; the two briefly reunite in New York when he finds her at the baby boutique where she works.

At the start of season 5, Jessa is studying to become a therapist and attending substance use support group meetings. When she pursues a relationship with Hannah's ex-boyfriend, Adam, she and Hannah have an explosive falling out. Jessa and Adam are then inspired to create an independent film about the experience. In the final season, she struggles with the realization that her life is in tatters, and is abandoned by Shosh. She also decides she is not ready to become a therapist. While Jessa remains in a relationship with Adam at the end of the series, she and Hannah make peace before Hannah leaves New York.

=== Shoshanna Shapiro ===
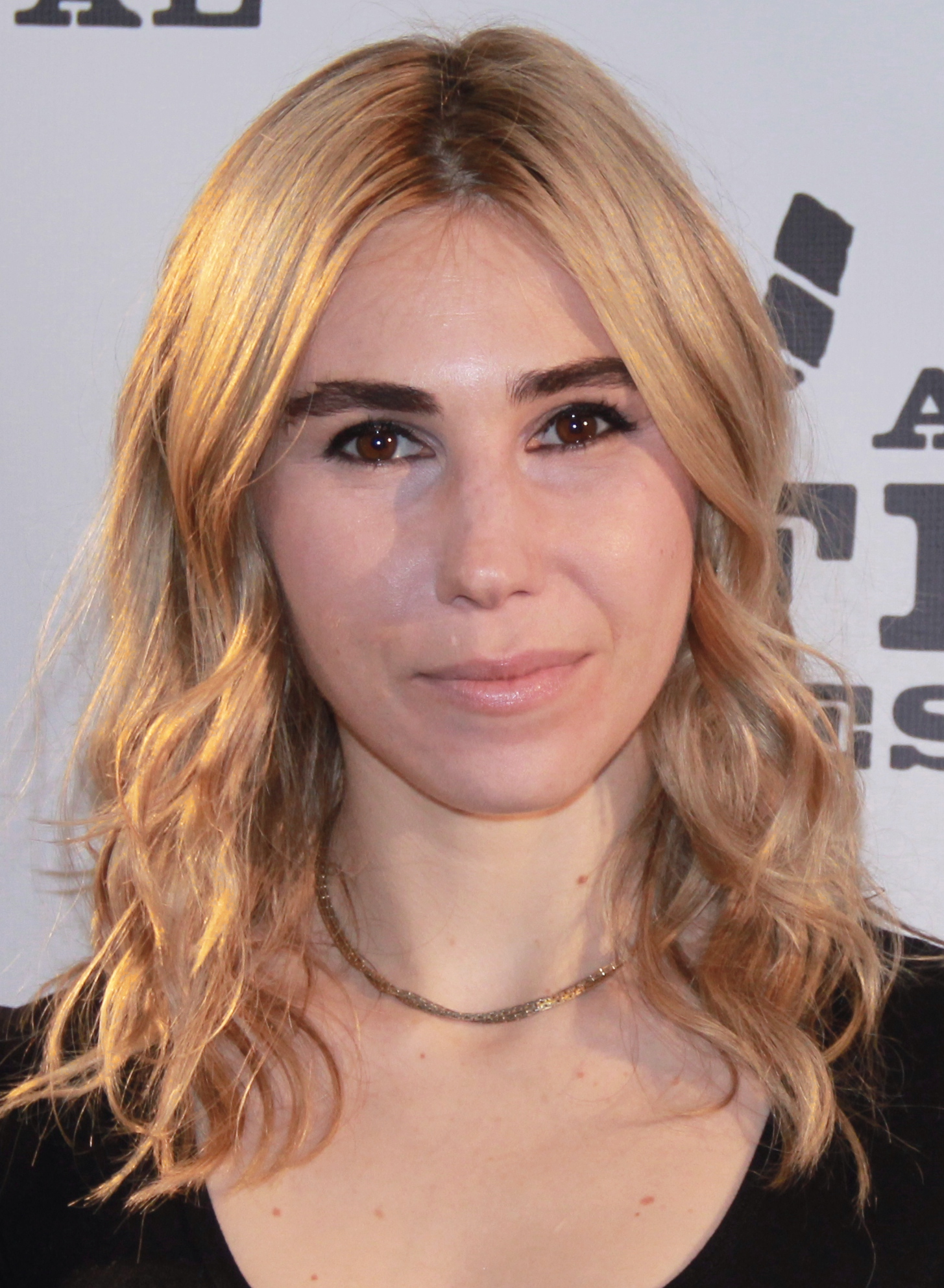
Zosia Mamet

- played by Zosia Mamet

Shoshanna Shapiro is Jessa's naive and innocent American cousin and a Media, Culture, and Communications major at New York University. The character is fast talking and her lack of enunciation gives her a mumbling, nervous persona. She is a fan of the TV series Sex and the City and is embarrassed to still be a virgin at the start of the series. Her first serious boyfriend is Ray. While Shoshanna breaks up with him at the end of season 2, the pair remain close throughout the rest of the series.

Shoshanna struggles to balance her academic and personal life throughout season 3 and discovers she is ineligible for graduation after failing a class. While she eventually graduates, she finds the postgraduate career search more difficult than she expected. At the end of season 4, Shoshana meets Scott at a job interview and they begin dating. Shortly after they begin dating, however, Shoshana accepts a job offer that has her relocating to Tokyo. Instead of breaking up, Shoshana and Scott decide to pursue a long-distance relationship.

At the beginning of season 5, Shoshanna thrives personally and professionally in Tokyo, making friends and developing a mutual attraction with a coworker named Yoshi. After being unexpectedly laid off from her job, Shoshanna decides to stay in Japan rather than return to New York, effectively breaking up with Scott. However, she eventually finds herself homesick and decides to come back to the United States. Upon her return, Shoshana takes a job helping Ray promote his coffee shop. She eventually realizes that her friendship with the other three has only ever held her back, and ultimately distances herself from them. By the end of the sixth season, she is engaged and has a new circle of friends.

=== Adam Sackler ===
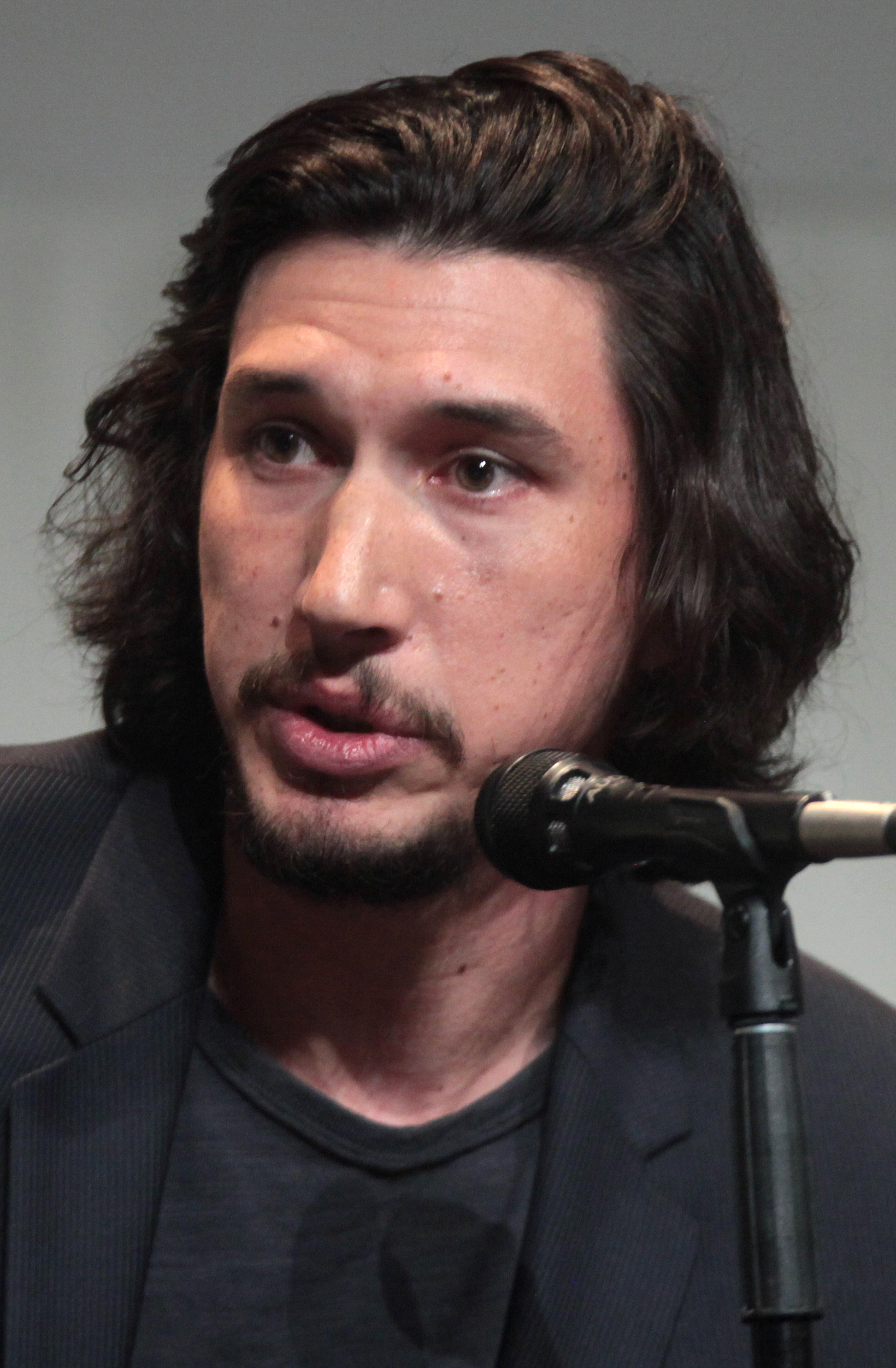
Adam Driver

- played by Adam Driver

Adam Sackler is an aloof, passionate young man who works as a part-time carpenter and actor. At the start of the series, he is in a casual relationship with Hannah. Their relationship becomes more serious after the season 2 finale, in which he runs across town to Hannah’s side when the stress of her book deal severely impacts her mental health. The pair grow distant due to the pressure Adam experiences when he is cast in a Broadway production of Major Barbara. While they agree to a long-distance relationship as Hannah attends the Iowa Writers Workshop, this falls through and Adam has already begun a new relationship with Mimi-Rose upon Hannah's return to New York.

Adam is an alcoholic who has been sober for years. He develops a bond with Jessa when they begin attending the same support group. The two develop a volatile relationship, causing a rift between Hannah and Jessa. When Hannah becomes pregnant, Adam considers reuniting with her to help raise the baby, but the pair ultimately decide not to rekindle their relationship.

Pulitzer Prize-winning art critic Jerry Saltz has endorsed the idea that Adam is intended to be a fictional scion of the real-life Sackler family, and that Adam's substance abuse and art world adjacency are intended as commentary on the real-life family's controversial relationship with the opioid crisis and arts philanthropy. Dunham has not commented on whether the character's naming was intentional.

=== Ray Ploshansky ===
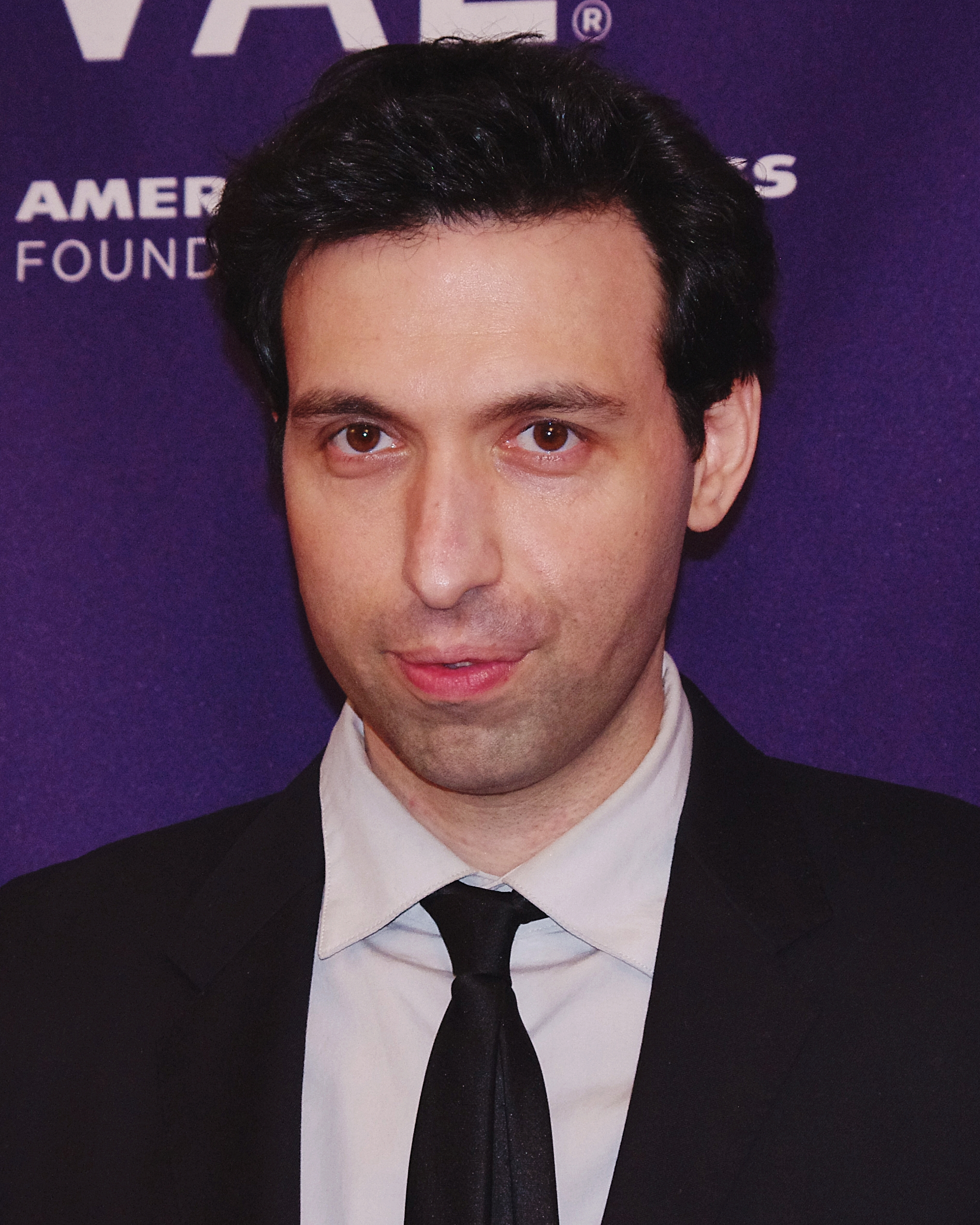
Alex Karpovsky

- played by Alex Karpovsky (seasons 2–6; recurring season 1)

Raymond "Ray" Ploshansky is introduced as Charlie's friend, but later becomes a friend of the others and the group's straight man. Unlike Hannah and her other friends, Ray is in his thirties. He works at Grumpy's, a local coffee shop. By the second season, he enters a relationship with Shoshanna. Even though the two break up, the experience encourages Ray to take himself more seriously; at the start of season 3, he is made manager of a spin-off of Grumpy's called Ray's. He also briefly dates Marnie in season 3.

Galvanized by poor traffic conditions in his neighborhood, Ray mounts a successful campaign for city council in season 4. He deals with competition from a hipster coffee shop across the street from Ray's throughout seasons 5 and 6. When Hermie, the proprietor of Grumpy's, dies in season 6, Ray continues Hermie's oral history project to document gentrification in Brooklyn.

=== Elijah Krantz ===
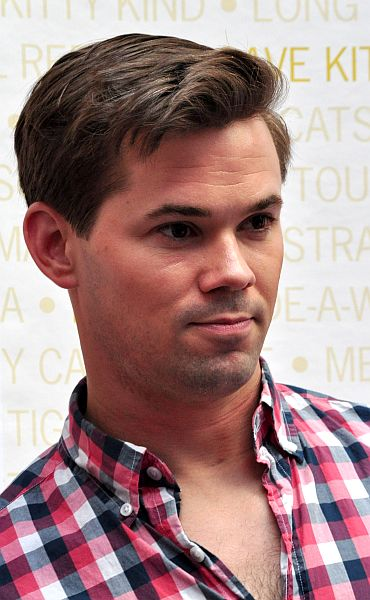
Andrew Rannells

- played by Andrew Rannells (seasons 4–6; recurring seasons 1–3)

Elijah Krantz is Hannah's ex-boyfriend from college who reveals that he is gay. Despite some initial hostility between the pair, they eventually become friends and later on-and-off roommates. The two grow much closer as roommates. Despite being gay, he has a one-night stand with Marnie that is a brief source of tension in Marnie and Hannah's friendship.

In seasons 3 and 4, Elijah dates Pal. Elijah enters a relationship with sophisticated television host Dill Harcourt in season 5 but is eventually heartbroken to realize that Dill is unwilling to settle down with one person.

Elijah aspires to become a Broadway performer and often tries to ingratiate himself into theatrical social circles. At the end of the series, riding off the emotions of his final conversation with Dill, he has a successful audition for a Broadway musical adaptation of White Men Can't Jump.

=== Desi Harperin ===
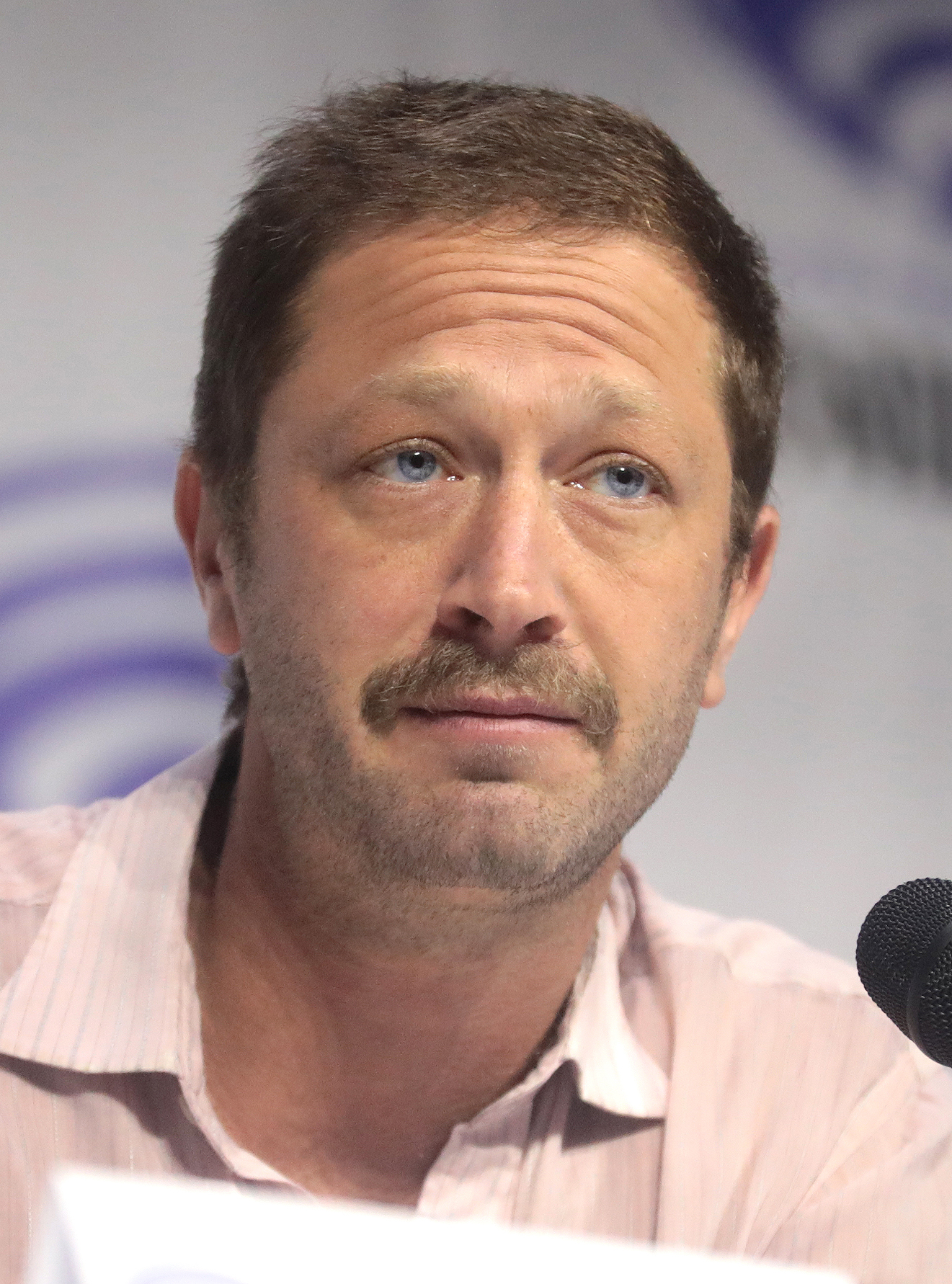
Ebon Moss-Bachrach

- played by Ebon Moss-Bachrach (seasons 4–6; recurring season 3)

Desi Harperin is introduced as Adam's co-star in Major Barbara and soon becomes Marnie's bandmate. Despite having a girlfriend, Clementine, he and Marnie engage in a sexual relationship. The secret nature of their relationship is a source of personal and professional frustration for Marnie as record label executives believe the pair would be more marketable as a romantic item. When Clementine eventually breaks up with Desi, he and Marnie have a public relationship. They become engaged, and later marry.

In season 6, Marnie eventually ends the relationship with him when she tires of his childishness and self-indulgence, though they continue their musical partnership. It is revealed that Desi is addicted to prescription pain killers after Marnie cheats on Ray with him.

=== Fran Parker ===
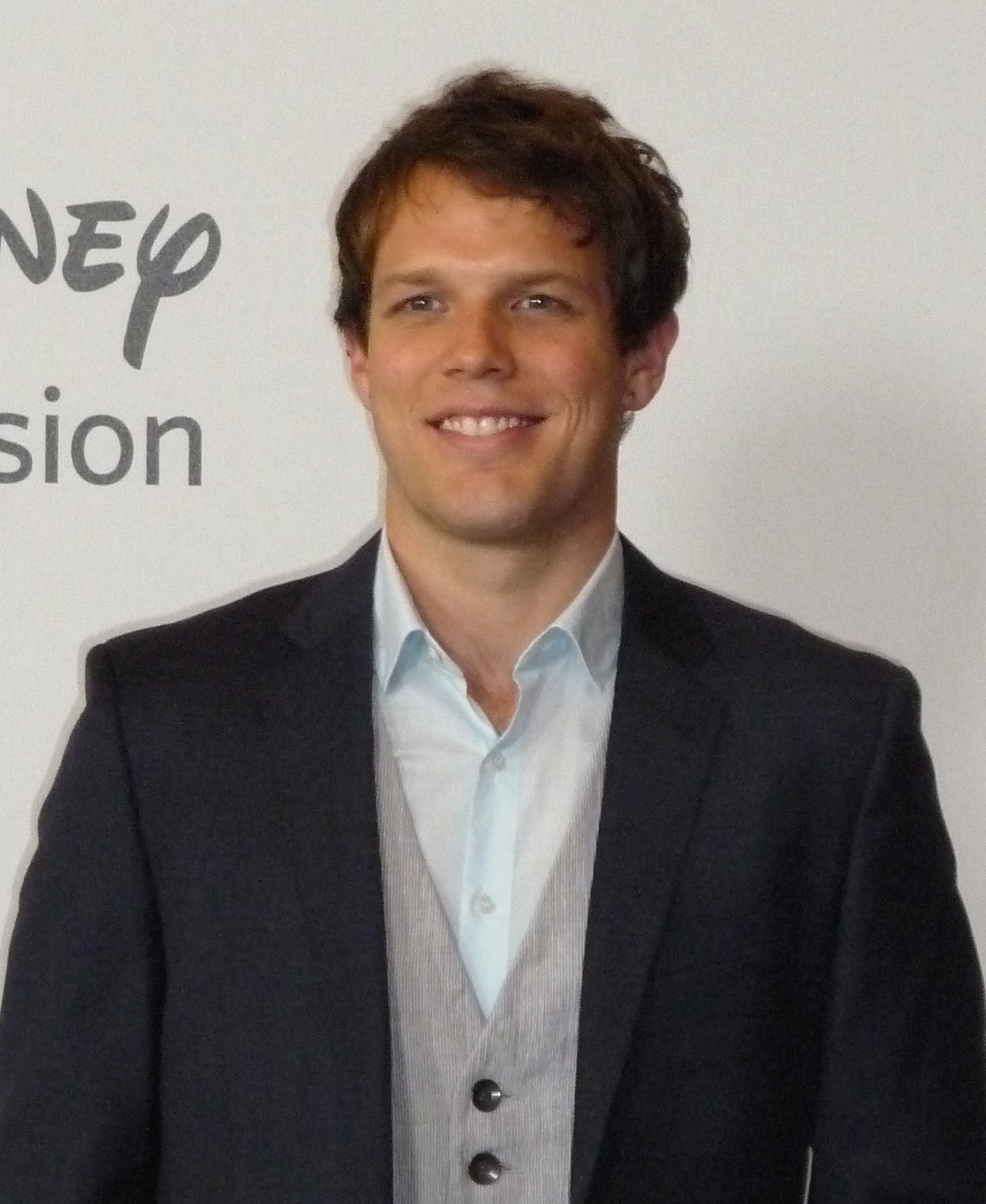
Jake Lacy

- played by Jake Lacy (season 5; recurring season 4)

Fran Parker is a fellow high school teacher at St. Justine's whom Hannah dates in season 5. While more emotionally stable than Adam, Fran is very critical of both Hannah's teaching style and her personal decisions. Fran moves in with Hannah and Elijah, but he and Hannah break up by the end of the season.

== Recurring characters ==
- Loreen and Tad Horvath, played by Becky Ann Baker and Peter Scolari respectively (seasons 1–6), Hannah's parents. They are both college professors at Michigan State University, and they live in East Lansing, Michigan. Loreen and Tad cut off Hannah's financial support in the pilot episode so that Hannah will become independent and focus on her writing. Hannah then visits them for their 30th anniversary, but does not share her recent financial troubles. In the fourth season, the marriage breaks down when Tad comes out as gay, and after a year of struggling on his own, Tad moves to New York to pursue a relationship with his new boyfriend (Ethan Phillips), while Loreen adjusts to life on her own, starts consuming cannabis and eventually fills the role of grandmother to Hannah's baby.
- Charlie Dattolo, played by Christopher Abbott (seasons 1–2, 5), Marnie's ex-boyfriend, with whom she became increasingly bored. For a while they contemplate their relationship and try to make it work, but eventually this erodes and Charlie leaves the series. Upon Charlie's abrupt return in season 5, he and Marnie briefly decide to run away together until Marnie realizes Charlie isn't the person he used to be.
- Katherine and Jeff Lavoyt, played by Kathryn Hahn and James LeGros respectively (season 1), the parents of two young girls that Jessa babysat. Katherine is a documentary filmmaker, and Jeff is unemployed. Jeff develops a romantic interest in Jessa, which she eventually stops. She is fired, but is later visited by Katherine who offers her job back. Despite deciding not to see each other again, they have a heart-to-heart over Jeff and Jessa's inability to grow up.
- Thomas-John, played by Chris O'Dowd (seasons 1–2), an affluent venture capitalist. After an earlier unpleasant encounter with Jessa and Marnie, he ends up marrying Jessa in a surprise ceremony at the end of the first season. They break up after an unpleasant dinner with his parents.
- Laird Schlesinger, played by Jon Glaser (seasons 2–6), Hannah's neighbor and a recovering drug addict.
- Hermie, played by Colin Quinn (seasons 2–6), Ray's boss at the coffee shop. He dies in "Painful Evacuation" from scleroderma.
- David Pressler-Goings, played by John Cameron Mitchell (seasons 2–3), Hannah's editor for her e-book. He is either bisexual or gay, as he downloaded the application Grindr in the episode "She Said OK". He is found dead in the episode "Dead Inside" with his funeral taking place at "Only Child" where it is revealed he had a wife named Annalise.
- Natalia, played by Shiri Appleby (seasons 2–3), Adam's ex-girlfriend. He abruptly breaks up with her after getting back together with Hannah.
- Caroline Sackler, played by Gaby Hoffmann (seasons 3–6), Adam's extremely troubled sister. She is very sarcastic towards Adam and Hannah until the latter kicks her out. She then lived with Laird, became pregnant by him and gave birth to their daughter before going AWOL in the fifth season. She reappears towards the end of the sixth season, encouraging Hannah to pursue her dreams outside the city.
- Jasper, played by Richard E. Grant (season 3), Jessa's friend from rehab. He comes to New York to find Jessa but later leaves her to be with his estranged daughter Dot.
- Mimi-Rose Howard, played by Gillian Jacobs (season 4), Adam's new girlfriend after Hannah moves away to Iowa.
- Scott, played by Jason Ritter (seasons 4–5), an entrepreneur and Shoshanna's boyfriend.
- Abigail, played by Aidy Bryant (seasons 4–6), Shoshanna's former boss from when she worked in Japan. She later appears again meeting Shoshanna and Ray by chance and works with Ray to continue Hermie's project of documenting the effects of gentrification. Ray and Abigail get on well together leading to them sharing a kiss.
- Dill Harcort, played by Corey Stoll (seasons 5–6), A successful news anchor and Elijah's love interest.

== Minor characters and guest stars ==
- Tally Schifrin, played by Jenny Slate (season 1, season 5), a former classmate of Hannah whose professional success is a source of annoyance.
- George, played by Billy Morrisette (seasons 1-2), Elijah's first boyfriend after coming out to Hannah.
- Evie Michaels, played by Rita Wilson (seasons 2-6), Marnie's mother.
- Sandy, played by Donald Glover (season 2), a Black Republican who Hannah briefly dates.
- Booth Johnathan, played by Jorma Taccone (seasons 1-2), an avant-garde artist who leads Marnie on romantically after they meet at an art gallery.
- Soojin, played by Greta Lee (seasons 2-3), Booth's former assistant who hopes to open her own art gallery, much to Marnie's annoyance.
- Joshua, played by Patrick Wilson (season 2, season 6), a doctor with whom Hannah has a one night stand. Years later, he delivers the news that she is pregnant.
- Angie, played by Amy Schumer (seasons 2-3), Natalia's friend.
- Janice, played by Jenna Lyons (season 3), Hannah's boss at GQ magazine.
- Kevin Mimma, Karen, and Joe, played by Amir Arison, Jessica Williams, and Michael Zegen respectively (season 3), Hannah's colleagues at GQ.
- Clementine Barrios, played by Natalie Morales (seasons 3-4), Desi's girlfriend who he leaves to be with Marnie.
- Beadie, played by Louise Lasser (season 3-4), an artist for whom Jessa briefly works as an assistant.
- Chester Chong, Logan, Chandra, D. August, Jeffrey, and Priya, played by Jason Kim, Marin Ireland, Desiree Akhavan, Ato Essandoh, Peter Mark Kendall, and Zuzanna Szadkowski respectively (season 4), Hannah's classmates at the Iowa Writer's Workshop.
- Toby Cook, played by Douglas McGrath (seasons 4-5), the principal at the school where Hannah teaches.
- Cleo, played by Maude Apatow (season 4), one of Hannah's students.
- Keith, played by Ethan Phillips (seasons 5-6), Tad Horvath's partner after coming out as gay.
- Tandice Moncrief, played by Lisa Bonet (season 5), a spiritual coach who comforts Desi after his divorce from Marnie.
- Paul-Louis, played by Riz Ahmed (season 6), a surf instructor and the father of Hannah's child.
