= Hims =

Hims could refer to:

- Homs, a city in Syria
- Hims & Hers Health, an American telehealth company
- Health information management system
