= Ashley & Martin =

- Type: Private
- Industry: Hair Loss; Hair Loss Treatment; Medical Hair Loss
- Founded: 1994
- Headquarters: West Perth, Australia
- Website: ashleyandmartin.com.au

Ashley & Martin is a hair loss treatment provider based in West Perth. They have 21 branches and are also the owners of World Hair Systems group.

The company operates in Australia, New Zealand and Singapore. They provide medical advice, ointments and prescription medications as part of their baldness treatment plans.

The CEO of Ashley & Martin is Richard Bond. The company's medical director and "hair restoration surgeon" is Dr Mario Terri. The chief executive is Phillip Raffan.

== History ==
Ashley & Martin was founded in 1994.

Revenue and profit figures for Ashley & Martin from 21 branches in Australia, New Zealand and Singapore are not known.

== Services ==
One of their offerings is the RealGROWTH Program, which is a medical treatment aimed at halting genetic hair loss and assisting to grow hair back. The program costs between $2400 and $4800 per person.

Ashley & Martin also prescribe medications such as topical finasteride.

== Legal matters ==
=== Australian Competition and Consumer Commission ===
In 2017, the Australian Competition and Consumer Commission (ACCC) launched legal action against the clinic. They claimed its terms required customers to commit to paying a full contract before attending their first medical consultation with a doctor. Between 2014 and 2017, the company contracts gave customers limited opt-out options, with those wishing to terminate the contracts more than two days after they accepted the program required to pay 100 per cent of the fee. Over 25,000 consumers were affected across three standard contracts. Justice Katrina Banks-Smith ruled in favour of the ACCC. The company updated their contracts to include a seven day opt-out period, option to pay in monthly instalments and a full money back guarantee if the treatment proves unsuccessful after eight to twelve months.

The Federal Court also expressed concern with the lotions and potions used in Ashley & Martins treatments, stating one shampoo that cost the company $1.23 was sold to customers for $15. Other products included:

- Minoxidil - a medication that cost the company between $25.30 and $55 a bottle but was sold to patients for $190
- Saw palmetto - a herbal extract that cost the company $3.52 a bottle but was sold to patients for $33
- Laser cap - a treatment that shone light on their scalps costing the company $1,100 but charged to customers at $2,800

In 2019, Ashley & Martin were ordered to refund customers who entered the program between June 2014 and June 2017 before receiving medical advice, and who had asked to terminate their contract or had asked to terminate their contract because of the medical advice they had received.

=== Commerce Commission ===
In 2022, the Commerce Commission bought charges against the company under the Fair Trading Act for unsubstantiated marketing claims. The company was fined $367,500 by Judge Nicola Mathers at the Auckland District court after claiming it had a 98% success rate based on an outdated trial and survey. They were also ordered to pay $1500 in court costs. Ashley & Martin admitted 10 charges of making unsubstantiated representations. The marketing claims were made between November 2016 and May 2021. The company's marketing materials no longer mention the statistic.

=== Pilot ===
In 2022, Ashley & Martin took Pilot, a men's health brand operated by Eucalyptus Health, to the Federal Court over online advertising claims they made in September-October. They initially sought compensation for false and misleading representations by Pilot. They also sought an interim injunction to force Pilot to take down the allegedly misleading and deceptive advertising, which was withdrawn the day after Pilot officially appointed a legal team to defend the case. They further asked for compensation under Australian Competition Law, a permanent injunction preventing Pilot from breaching the misleading and deceptive product conduct rules, court declarations that Pilot's claims were deceptive and corrective notices published where ads appeared. The case was scheduled before Justice Darren Jackson on December 7, 2022.

=== ASIC ===
In 2023, Ashley & Martin went to the Supreme Court seeking judicial mercy after the Australian Securities and Investments Commission (ASIC) wrote demanding it prepare and file legally required reports. Accepting claims of confusion over changes to Federal definitions of large private companies, the judge excused the group from requirements to file publicly available director and financial reports for fiscal 2018-19. ASIC had been told of the application but neither opposed nor supported the relief sought.
