= Andrew Dudum =

American entrepreneur, investor, and CEO of Hims & Hers Health

- Education: University of Pennsylvania (Wharton School)
- Occupation: Entrepreneur
- Years active: 2010–present
- Known for: Founder and CEO of Hims & Hers Health
- Title: CEO, Hims & Hers Health

Andrew Dudum is a Palestinian-American entrepreneur who is the founder and CEO of telehealth startup Hims & Hers Health, Inc.

== Early life and education ==
Dudum was born and raised in San Francisco, California. He is an American of Palestinian heritage. He trained as a classical cellist and performed live across the United States and Europe, at hundreds of concerts and weddings, including at Carnegie Hall. He attended the Wharton School of the University of Pennsylvania, where he studied Management and Economics. Dudum did not finish his degree and is therefore a college dropout.

== Career ==
While in college, Dudum co-founded LendforPeace, a nonprofit microlending site for Middle Eastern entrepreneurs. He later worked at TokBox, a video-chat startup that was eventually acquired. The acquisition of TokBox freed Dudum up to pursue his goal to build a startup. In 2013, Dudum co-founded Atomic Labs, a San Francisco-based startup studio backed by investors such as Peter Thiel and Marc Andreessen. Atomic launched companies including Bungalow, Homebound, TalkIQ, and Terminal. In 2016, Dudum founded Hims, a direct-to-consumer telehealth startup, still as part of Atomic. He has served as CEO since its inception. The company expanded into women's health under the brand Hims & Hers, offering online consultations, prescriptions, and over-the-counter products. Hims raised over US$100 million in funding and became a “unicorn” in 2019. In 2020, Hims went public via a SPAC at a $1.6 billion valuation, debuting on the New York Stock Exchange in January 2021 under the ticker NYSE: HIMS. In 2024, Hims & Hers expanded into GLP-1 weight loss medicine and generated annual revenues of $1.48 billion. Andrew Dudum has a net worth of approximately $1 billion.

== Controversies ==
In 2024, Dudum drew both praise and some criticism for a social media post in which he encouraged companies to hire student protesters involved in anti-Israel demonstrations. He later clarified his statement as support for peaceful protest and free speech.

In 2025, his San Francisco donut shop, George's Donuts & Merriment, drew local backlash after a $1 million Hims & Hers donation to President Donald Trump's inaugural committee became public.

In mid-2025, Hims & Hers Health faced increased scrutiny after its partnership with Novo Nordisk ended, with both companies citing differing views on compounded GLP-1 weight-loss drugs. Reuters and Bloomberg reported that despite the termination, Hims continued its expansion and reaffirmed annual guidance. Following legal conflict between the companies, an agreement was reached in March 2026 for Hims to sell Novo Nordisk weight loss products through their online platform.

== See also ==
- Hims & Hers Health
