= Peter J. Levine =

American venture capitalist

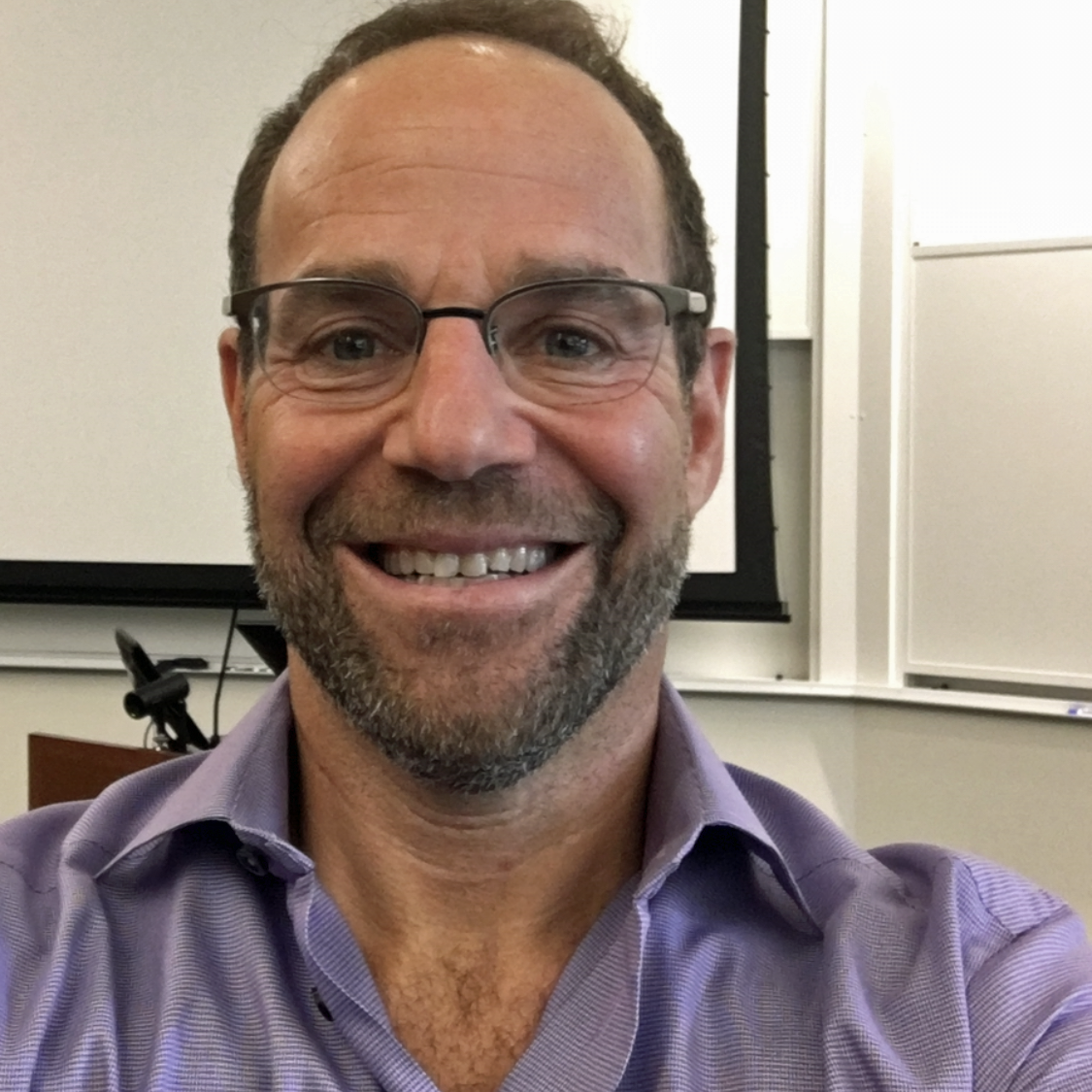
- Education: Boston University; MIT Sloan (student and lecturer); Stanford GSB (lecturer)
- Occupation: Venture capitalist
- Employer: Andreessen Horowitz

Peter J. Levine is an American software executive and venture capitalist.

== Early life ==
Levine grew up in Northeastern USA. While attending summer camp in the Adirondack Mountains, he gained a lifelong passion for leadership and the outdoors. Levine earned a BS in engineering from Boston University in 1983, and worked as a software engineer on Project Athena at MIT, while attending the MIT Sloan School of Management in 1988 and 1989.

== Business career ==
From 1990 through 2001 he was an early employee of Veritas Software, beginning his career as a software engineer and ending as an executive vice president. Levine was a general partner at Mayfield Fund from 2002 through 2005, prior to becoming president and CEO of Xensource in February 2006. After working to grow the company's business, Xensource was acquired by Citrix in 2007 for $500 million, with Levine being named a vice president of Citrix.

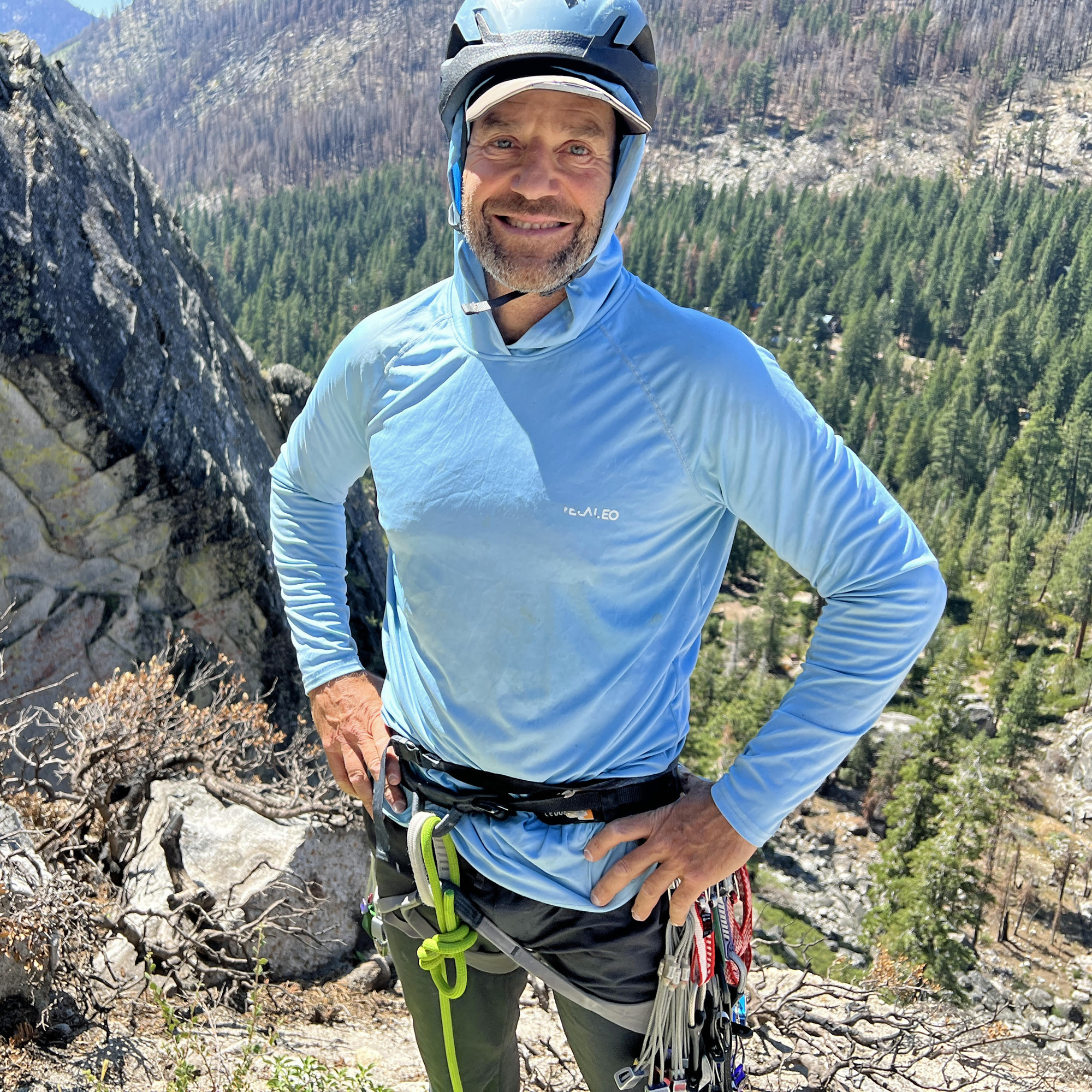
Levine in 2022

Levine taught marketing and sales at the Sloan School of Management in 2010 and 2011, and at the Stanford Graduate School of Business starting in 2012., and he began lecturing at Dartmouth College Tuck School of Business in 2026.

In March 2011, Levine became a partner at the Silicon Valley venture capital firm Andreessen Horowitz, leading the firm's investments in enterprise software including data center technology, enterprise applications and mobile computing. Levine has led the firm's investments at GitHub (acquired by MSFT in 2018 for $7.5B), Figma (FIG, IPO 2025), DigitalOcean (DOCN, IPO 2021), Mixpanel, ShieldAI, Apollo GraphQL, PlanetScale, Graphite Software, LabelBox and a number of other software companies. He became a member of the board of trustees of the National Outdoor Leadership School in 2013 for a term through 2019.
