= Margit Wennmachers =

Venture capitalist and public relations executive

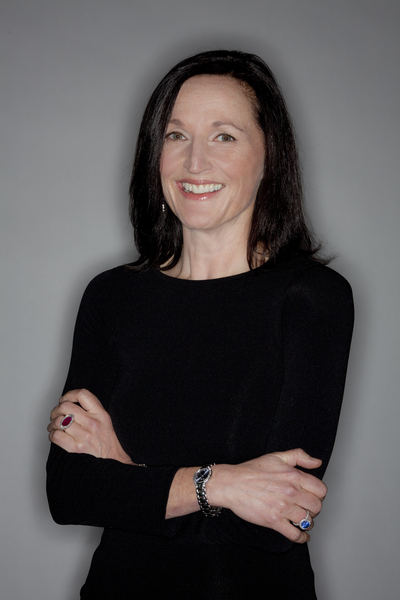
- Margit Wennmachers of Andreessen Horowitz
- Born: 1965 (age 60–61)
- Education: University of Lippstadt, Germany
- Occupations: Venture Capitalist, Andreessen Horowitz

Margit Wennmachers (born 1965) is a venture capitalist at the Silicon Valley venture capital firm Andreessen Horowitz and a co-founder of OutCast Communications (now The OutCast Agency).

== Biography ==
Born and raised in Breberen, Germany, Wennmachers' father was a mushroom farmer and pig farmer. She is the youngest of four children. Her mother died in a car accident when she was 18. Wennmachers earned a bachelor's degree in business from the University of Lippstadt, Germany.

== Career ==
Wennmachers began her career in the European office of a U.S.-based startup. She later moved to San Francisco to join Blanc & Otus, a high-tech communications firm. In 1997, she co-founded OutCast Communications with Caryn Marooney. By 2010, their clients included Facebook, Autodesk, Amazon, Yahoo!, EMC, Netflix, Cisco, Zimbra and VMware, as well as Andreessen Horowitz. Under her’ leadership, OutCast grew from two employees to a multimillion-dollar business.

Wennmachers became a partner of Andreessen Horowitz in September 2010 to help identify and evaluate new start-ups for investment potential and advise the firm and its portfolio companies on marketing and branding. Andreessen Horowitz's investments include Twitter, Jawbone, Facebook, Foursquare, Groupon, and Zynga.

Wennmachers became a non-executive director at Next Fifteen Communications Group plc in 2011. She also serves on the board of trustees for the World Affairs Council. She has been a speaker at the DLD Conference in 2011 and 2013, Ad: Tech in 2012, Upward in 2014, and The Spark in 2016.

Wennmachers was named to Silicon Valley/San Jose Business Journal's list of 100 Women of Influence for 2012.
