= Josh Wolfe =

American entrepreneur

- Born: c. 1978 (age 47–48); Coney Island, New York City, United States
- Education: Cornell University
- Occupation: Venture capitalist
- Years active: 2000–present
- Known for: Co-founder of Lux Capital
- Spouse: Lauren Wolfe (née Taylor)
- Children: 3

Josh Wolfe is an American venture capitalist who is the founder of Lux Capital, a venture capital firm that invests in emerging technologies.

== Early life and education ==
Wolfe was raised in Coney Island, Brooklyn, New York City, by a single mother who worked as a public school teacher. Wolfe graduated from the Dyson School of Applied Economics and Management at Cornell University in 1999 with a BS in finance. He is Jewish, and had his bar mitzvah in Jerusalem.

== Career ==
Wolfe co-founded Lux Capital in 2000 with Peter Hébert and Robert Paull.

In January 2025, following the launch of Chinese large language model DeepSeek, Wolfe called for increased investment in American artificial intelligence.

In 2025, following the Second Trump Administration's cuts to research funding, Wolfe announced Lux Capital would invest a minimum of $100 million in biotech and artificial intelligence.

On September 29, 2025, Wolfe met with Prime Minister of Israel Benjamin Netanyahu along with other technology investors to discuss the use of artificial intelligence to boost Israel's military and economy.
