= Hadrian Automation =

American defense manufacturing company

- Type: Private
- Industry: Manufacturing; Defense; Aerospace
- Founded: 2021
- Founder: Chris Power
- Headquarters: Torrance, United States
- Key people: Chris Power (CEO)
- Products: Hadrian is a next-generation manufacturing company transforming the U.S. industrial base by rapidly adding domestic manufacturing capacity through its highly automated factories. By integrating process engineering, artificial intelligence, machine learning, and robotics, Hadrian strengthens American manufacturing capabilities and enables U.S. workers to compete globally.
- Website: www.hadrian.co

Hadrian Automation, also referred to as Hadrian, is an American manufacturing company that designs and operates automated, software-driven factories to produce precision components for the aerospace and defense sectors. The company builds modular, AI-enabled production systems that cover the production chain, from raw material sourcing to the building of completed, military-grade systems. The company serves various sectors like shipbuilding, autonomous drones or defense in general.

== History and development ==
=== Founding and funding ===
Hadrian was founded in 2021 by Chris Power with the goal of building highly automated factories for precision-machined aerospace and defense hardware. Power is from Australia and he got the idea of building Hadrian after witnessing geopolitical tensions between the United States and China.

Hadrian's initial facility opened in Hawthorne, California, where the company focused on automating CNC machining, inspection, scheduling, and other traditionally manual operations.

In 2022, the company raised a US$90 million round led by Lux Capital and Andreessen Horowitz as it expanded operations supporting aerospace suppliers. Founders Fund is another longtime backer, having invested in Hadrian since its seed round. In July 2025, the Founders Fund co-led the $260 million Series C with Lux Capital.

The company's technicians come from all backgrounds, including former nursers and marines who have not worked in manufacturing, and it trains them in 30 to 60 days.

=== Factories ===
By 2024, Hadrian had opened a larger facility in Torrance, California and broadened its software-first factory model. In 2025, it launched a second Torrance facility, dedicated to R&D ("Factory X").

In July 2025, the company announced construction of a 270,000-square-foot manufacturing hub in Mesa, Arizona ("Factory 3"), expected to employ approximately 350 workers. The Mesa facility became operational in December 2025. In March 2026, Hadrian launched a fourth facility ("Factory 4") 2.25 million square foot facility in Cherokee, Alabama, dedicated to submarine production. It also plans to build up to five additional factories over the course of 2026, each customized for a military segment.

Following the Series C raise, Hadrian launched a division called Hadrian Maritime, focused on naval and shipbuilding manufacturing.

== Partnerships and acquisitions ==
Hadrian established a supply and manufacturing partnership with Anduril Industries, aiming at producing precision components for Anduril's autonomous defense systems and supporting scalable hardware production.

Alongside Palantir, 8VC, General Catalyst, Oklo Inc., Dirac and Atomic Industries, Hadrian is a founding member of the New American Industrial Alliance (NAIA), a trade organization founded in 2024. The other members are also defense contractors and hardtech companies, such as Anduril, Andreessen Horowitz, Narya Capital, Booz Allen, Joby Aviation, Regent Craft and Impulse Space, which hope to reduce government regulations.

In 2025, Hadrian acquired Datum Source, a software firm launched by SpaceX alumni that leverages AI to connect hardware companies with the right manufacturing partners.

== Influence ==
Media outlets have cited Hadrian as part of a trend to reindustrialize American manufacturing and accelerate procurement for defense hardware, especially to counter rising geopolitical competition from countries like China.

Chris Power, the CEO, told Bloomberg that many Silicon Valley tech leaders had long held an impression that the government was a "big slow-moving beast that is not worth really engaging with", but in recent years, the government has been moving to a new model that emphasizes missions and provides incentives, instead of requiring companies to do strictly defined jobs.

In 2025, Breaking Defense remarks that Hadrian is still relatively small in comparison with more-established defense startups, having attained $3 million in revenue in 2024. Hadrian's methods and technology is considered more nimble than those of traditional manufacturing companies. It claims that with its Opus software, it can bring its factories online within a short period (around six months). Los Angeles Business Journal comments on the company's Factory-as-a-Service model: "Instead of giant warehouses filled with machines, Hadrian's factories operate much like a big computer, with every system speaking to the other to complete manufacturing processes autonomously." Manufacturing Today remarks that while Hadrian's system offers faster, more reliable component supply, with end-to-end automation, it faces competition with other innovators like Relativity Space, which focuses on different technologies such as 3D printing to improve rocket components. Challenges also lie in scaling and dealing with cyber threats.

The Australian Financial Review remarks that Hadrian, like other new military industrial players such as Anduril, benefits from business and political connections to the investor Peter Thiel, members of the Trump administration and Trump family, including investments from the 1789 Capital, where Donald Trump Jr. serves as a partner. It is also a company linked to Andreessen Horowitz's American Dynamism initiative and the venture capital firm's influential tech investor and writer Katherine Boyle. The New Yorker writes that in supporting companies like Hadrian and Castelion (hypersonic missiles), Boyle is promoting the idea that "America is good, and that building things that make the country stronger and safer is also good—both morally and financially", and that strengthening the defense sector is also compatible with good family values.

== See also ==
- Aerospace manufacturing
- Defense industrial base
