= Pilot (telehealth company) =

Australian men's telehealth company

- Type: Subsidiary
- Industry: Telehealth; Digital health; Weight management; Sexual Health
- Founded: 2019
- Successor: Hims
- Headquarters: Sydney, Australia
- Website: pilot.com.au; hims.com.au

Pilot is a direct-to-consumer telehealth clinic that is owned and operated by Eucalyptus Health. The service operates in Australia and targets a male audience. Their core offerings include mental health concerns, sleep issues, erectile dysfunction, premature ejaculation, weight management and hair loss.

Pilot's services are accessed through an online pre-screening questionnaire, followed by a consultation with a GP or pharmacist. Their programs may include scheduled drugs such as Viagra (Sildenafil), finasteride, Wegovy or Mounjaro alongside online coaching and diet plans.

In 2026, Eucalyptus Health was acquired by the American telehealth company Hims & Hers Health, after which the Pilot brand was retired and its services relaunched under the Hims name in Australia.

== History ==
Tim Doyle, Charlie Gearside and Benny Kleist founded Pilot in 2019.

To launch the platform, they raised AUD $2 million from investors, including Blackbird Ventures and Comcast Ventures founder Daniel Gulati.

== Services ==
Pilot is a technology platform for men. It provides telehealth services for men's issues including weight management, erectile dysfunction, premature ejaculation, herpes, skin and hair loss.

Pilot prescribes Viagra and is also one of the larger online providers of finasteride in Australia. They also prescribe glucagon-like peptide-1 (GLP-1) receptor agonist medications, including Wegovy (semaglutide) and Mounjaro (tirzepatide), as part of their weight management program, alongside online coaching and diet plans.

In Australia, Pilot cannot publicly advertise any medicines by name before consultation, due to advertising restrictions enforced by the Therapeutic Goods Administration (TGA).

== Relationship with Eucalyptus Health ==
Pilot was the first brand established by Eucalyptus Health. It operates alongside Juniper, Kin, Software and Compound.

=== Acquisition and rebranding ===
Eucalyptus Health was acquired by American company, Hims & Hers Health, in 2026. Following the acquisition, the Pilot brand was retired and relaunched under the Hims name on 31 August 2026, with existing Pilot clinicians transitioned to the Hims platform.

== Business model ==
Pilot is a vertical integration telehealth company that offers specific treatments for specific ailments. Patients complete an online assessment and pay a fee to Pilot to talk to a doctor. If treatment is recommended, the patient signs up for a monthly subscription. Medication is delivered to their specified address.

Pilot acts as a wholesaler of Schedule 4 medications. Medications are supplied via partner pharmacies. In most cases, they do not offer items available through Medicare or the Pharmaceutical Benefits Scheme (PBS).

== Regulatory scrutiny ==
In September 2022, Pilot launched a controversial advertising campaign taking aim at R U OK? day. Large billboards with R U OK?'s corporate branding criticised the mental health awareness initiative for making conversation rather than taking action. The campaign received criticism for appearing as a marketing effort disguised as mental health advocacy, with critics noting the company's treatment model focuses on pharmaceutical prescriptions rather than counselling services.

In 2023, TV station Seven featured a story about former AFL player and Pilot ambassador Dale Thomas on its news bulletin. Pilot received criticism about the story presenting more like an informercial. ABC TV's Media Watch featured Eucalyptus and Pilot to further highlight the paid partnership and lack of reporting on the upcoming regulator crackdowns. Pilot later turned the news bulletin into an ad on Facebook and Instagram.

In 2024, Pilot's TV ad for an erectile dysfunction treatment received 35 complaints for concerns of sexual innuendo to Ad Standards. The Ad Standard Community Panel assessed whether the ad breached the advertising rules and determined no breach. In 2025, the same ad received 32 complaints with the same outcome.

In 2025, Pilot received backlash for their Father's Day campaign, which encouraged its Instagram followers to "gift" their father the company's erectile dysfunction treatments instead of a more traditional gift. The media claimed that it was taking advantage of the lack of a nationally recognised framework for safety and quality across online-only telehealth services by advertising prescription-only drugs on social media.

== Legal matters ==
In 2022, Ashley & Martin sued Pilot in Federal Court over online advertising claims made in September-October. They initially sought compensation for false and misleading representations by Pilot. They also sought an interim injunction to force Pilot to take down the allegedly misleading and deceptive advertising, which was withdrawn the day after Pilot officially appointed a legal team to defend the case. They further asked for compensation under Australian Competition Law, a permanent injunction preventing Pilot from breaching the misleading and deceptive product conduct rules, court declarations that Pilot's claims were deceptive and corrective notices published where ads appeared. The case was scheduled before Justice Darren Jackson on December 7, 2022.

== Partnerships ==
Pilot uses the lure of celebrities in their marketing, including players from the NRL team, the Cronulla Sharks, for which Pilot is a named sponsor. Mixed martial arts star Jack Della Maddalena and Australian swimmer James Magnussen have also been featured.

In 2022, Pilot donated AUD $120,000 to the free phone counselling service, This is a Conversation Starter (TIACS).
