= Tempo Automation =

- Type: Public
- Traded as: Nasdaq: TMPO
- Industry: PCB assembly
- Founded: 2013
- Founder: Jeff McAlvay; Jesse Koenig; Shashank Samala
- Headquarters: San Francisco, CA, United States
- Key people: Joy Weiss (President & CEO)
- Website: tempoautomation.com

Tempo Automation was an American electronics development and manufacturing company based in San Francisco, California.

== History ==
Tempo was founded in 2013 by Jeff McAlvay, Jesse Koenig, and Shashank Samala. They started manufacturing customer orders through their platform in 2016.

In 2015, the company raised $8 million in Series A venture funding, led by Lux Capital. They raised $20 million in Series B funding in 2018, and an additional $45 million in Series C funding in 2019, with investors including Point72 Ventures, Lockheed Martin, and Uncork Capital, bringing their total raised to $74.6 million.

In 2018, the company opened a new factory in San Francisco to produce printed circuit boards for low-volume manufacturers and prototyping. In 2019, Joy Weiss was named president and chief executive officer, replacing founding CEO Jeff McAlvay, who became Tempo's chief process officer.

In November 2022, the company went public through a SPAC merger with ACE Convergence Acquisition Corp., raising $100 million from White Lion Capital. The company was listed on the Nasdaq stock exchange with ticker TMPO on November 23.

In July 2023, the company laid off 62 employees, leaving only 7. Their stock was delisted from Nasdaq in October 2023 after falling below the $50M market cap requirement.
