= Eucalyptus Health =

Australian telehealth company

- Type: Private
- Industry: Online pharmacy; Telehealth
- Founded: 2019; 7 years ago
- Founder: Tim Doyle (CEO); Charlie Gearside; Benny Kleist; Alexey Mitko
- Headquarters: Sydney, Australia
- Area served: Australia; Germany; Japan; United Kingdom; Canada
- Products: Weight management; Men's health; Reproductive and fertility health; Dermatology; Erectile dysfunction treatment; Premature ejaculation treatment; Hair loss treatment; Contraception; GLP-1 receptor agonist therapy
- Brands: Juniper; Software; Kin; Pilot; Compound
- Revenue: 120,900,000 Australian dollar (2024)
- Website: eucalyptus.health

Eucalyptus Health is an Australian digital health company founded in 2019 that operates telehealth services including Pilot (men's health), Juniper (women's weight management and menopause), Software (dermatology), and Kin (reproductive health). The company is headquartered in Sydney and has expanded to the United Kingdom, Germany, Japan and Canada.

Eucalyptus is the first telehealth company in Australia accredited by the Australian Council on Healthcare Standards (ACHS) against EQuIP6 standards for safety and quality of clinical services.

== History ==
Eucalyptus was founded in 2019 by Tim Doyle, Charlie Gearside, Benny Kleist, and Alexey Mitko. The company launched Pilot, a men's health telehealth service, as its first brand. Subsequent brands included Juniper (weight management), Software (dermatology), and Kin (fertility and reproductive health).

In June 2023, Eucalyptus acquired the digital assets of Jenny Craig Australia after the brand entered voluntary administration.

The company raised A$8 million in Series A funding in May 2020, $30 million in Series B in July 2021, and $60 million in Series C in January 2022. A 2023 funding round raised an additional A$50 million. The company was valued at $560 million in April 2023.

In February 2026, Eucalyptus was acquired by Hims & Hers Health in a transaction valued at up to US$1.15 billion. The transaction was completed in June 2026.

== Services ==
Eucalyptus provides telehealth consultations, e-prescriptions, and medication delivery through partner pharmacies. Services are delivered through specialised brands targeting specific health concerns:

- Pilot offers treatment for erectile dysfunction, premature ejaculation, hair loss, and weight management.
- Juniper provides GLP-1 receptor agonist therapy (such as Ozempic, Mounjaro and Wegovy) combined with health coaching for weight management.
- Software delivers online dermatology consultations and prescription skincare formulations.
- Kin provides reproductive health services including contraception, fertility support, and pregnancy care.
- Compound, a men's preventative health program launched in 2024, was paused later that year before relaunching in the UK in 2025.

The company reported revenue of A$120.9 million in FY 2024, with 60% generated from international markets.

== Regulatory scrutiny ==
The Royal Australian College of General Practitioners (RACGP) raised concerns in 2023 about telehealth services using remote questionnaires to prescribe GLP-1 receptor agonists, questioning whether such methods provided adequate clinical assessment. The Therapeutic Goods Administration (TGA) warned telehealth companies against advertising prescription-only medicines directly to consumers.

During GLP-1 medication shortages in 2023–2024, Eucalyptus partnered with compounding pharmacies to provide compounded semaglutide. This practice drew criticism from pharmaceutical manufacturers and regulators. The Australian federal government subsequently banned pharmacy compounding of GLP-1 drugs from October 2024.

Media reports in The Sydney Morning Herald and The Australian questioned whether social media and influencer campaigns for Eucalyptus brands overstated treatment results. ABC's Media Watch raised concerns about whether television segments promoting the company's services blurred editorial and advertising boundaries.

In response to regulatory concerns, Eucalyptus introduced phone-based GP consultations to replace asynchronous online forms.

In June 2025, the TGA issued class-wide safety warnings for all GLP-1 and dual GIP/GLP-1 receptor agonists, including medications prescribed through Juniper, regarding aspiration risks during general anaesthesia. The warnings required updates to product information across all suppliers of these medications.

In September 2025, Eucalyptus introduced an AI chatbot prompting warning from professional bodies about the use of artificial intelligence in weight-loss programs.

In late December 2025, peak eating disorder advocacy groups expressed concerns about the rapid rollout of GLP-1 weight-loss treatments alongside their aggressive marketing on social media. There were concerns from The Australia and New Zealand Academy for Eating Disorders that these marketing techniques could target people who do not need the medication. Juniper's Black Friday sale was one of the marketing practices in question.

=== Workforce and operational practices ===
In 2022, Eucalyptus had to cut 20% of its staff from across their brands after an investment firm pulled out of its decision to loan the company money. The investment firm was not named however the layoffs affected 50 to 60 people across multiple brands of the company. Comparable overseas start-ups, such as Ro (company) and Hims & Hers Health have faced similar struggles.

In 2026, four current and former medical assistants from the Philippines spoke anonymously against Eucalyptus and their "impossible" benchmarks that were raised in 2025. It is alleged that Eucalyptus raised the number of queries that each assistant should process to more than 65 a day, with some employees assigned up to 80 new tickets. Failing to meet these metrics leads to escalation from management with fear of termination. The pressure aligns with Eucalyptus' growth however has led to increased employee turnover and dependence on AI.

== Revenue ==
The online healthcare startup has more than tripled its $520 million valuation following a AU$50 million raise in April 2023.

It is reported that Eucalyptus currently has an annual revenue run-rate (ARR) upward of US$450 million and delivers quarterly triple-digit year-on-year ARR growth in 2025.

The business is not yet profitable. In the 2024 financial year, it posted an AU$15.2 million after-tax loss.

== Acquisition ==
The company is currently being acquired by NYSE-listed health and wellness company, Hims & Hers Health in a deal worth US$1.15 billion (AU$1.6 billion).

The acquisition includes a US$240 million (AU$340 million) payment when the deal closes, then deferred payments in cash or stock over the following 18 months, plus additional earn-out payments based on financial targets until 2029.

Eucalyptus is also known to have an employee-friendly equity term. The value of employee shares under the deal, excluding its co-founders, is approximately AU$300 million. The average employee participant is expected to receive AU$420,000.

Co-founder and CEO Tim Doyle, will become the SVP of international operations at Hims & Hers.
