= Leslie Feinzaig =

Costa Rican-American venture capitalist and technologist

- Born: c. 1979; San José, Costa Rica
- Education: University of London; Harvard University
- Occupations: Venture Capitalist; Technologist
- Children: 2
- Relatives: Eliécer Feinzaig Mintz (cousin)

Leslie Feinzaig (born c. 1979) is a Costa Rican-American venture capitalist and technologist who is the founder and chief executive officer of the Graham & Walker venture fund. She founded the Female Founders Alliance and an accelerator in support of women entrepreneurs. She is a contributor at Fortune and Fast Company.

== Early life and education ==
Feinzaig was born c. 1979 in San José, Costa Rica. Her Jewish grandparents fled Poland at the onset of the Holocaust. Feinzaig's grandfather was denied entry at Ellis Island due to the Immigration Act of 1924 and eventually settled in Costa Rica. She was raised in Costa Rica where she worked as a store manager and a call center employee. Feinzaig completed a bachelor's degree at the London School of Economics. In 2005, she enrolled at Harvard Business School, earning a M.B.A. on a full scholarship.

== Career ==
Feinzaig is an entrepreneur, venture capitalist, and technologist. On a H-1B visa, she worked for Microsoft during the Great Recession. Feinzaig left Microsoft upon receiving her green card in 2013. She also worked at Big Fish Games and Julep. In 2016, she created Venture Kits, a Seattle-based subscription company that sells entrepreneurial educational children's toys. In February 2017, Feinzaig founded the Seattle Female Founders Alliance for female founders of venture-scale startups. In 2018, she founded Ready Set Raise, an equity-free accelerator for women. As of 2024, Feinzaig is a managing director of the Graham & Walker venture fund. During the 2024 United States presidential election, she was a primary organizer of VCsForKamala.

== Personal life ==
Feinzaig is married and has two children. They reside in Seattle, Washington. Costa Rican legislator Eliécer Feinzaig Mintz is her cousin.
