= Juniper (telehealth company) =

Online weight management company

- Type: Private
- Industry: Telehealth; Digital health; Weight management
- Founded: Early 2020
- Headquarters: Sydney, Australia
- Parent: Eucalyptus Health
- Website: www.myjuniper.com

Juniper is an online weight-management company operated by Eucalyptus Health. It provides telehealth-based care. Its core offerings include weight management and menopause-related services. The service operates in Australia, the United Kingdom, Germany, Japan and Canada.

Juniper's programs are accessed through an online intake and clinician-led consultation. The program is combined with lifestyle support (referred to as health coaching), and may include prescription treatment with glucagon-like peptide-1 (GLP-1) receptor agonist medications, such as semaglutide (sold as Wegovy or Ozempic) and tirzepatide (Mounjaro), where clinically appropriate and allowed by local laws.

== History ==
As Eucalyptus Health shifted its telehealth services into obesity and metabolic health in the early 2020s, Juniper became one of its primary brands. The change aligned with the growing global demand for GLP-1 receptor agonist medications.

In 2023, the Australian operations of weight-loss company Jenny Craig went into voluntary administration. Eucalyptus Health acquired the assets, including their online infrastructure, to broaden their services across brands, including Juniper.

== Services ==
Juniper provides weight-management services via telehealth. Their programs are delivered through an online health assessment followed by a clinician review and consultation. If eligible, patients may be prescribed weight-loss medications approved by the Therapeutic Goods Administration (TGA) or other regulators. This could include liraglutide (Saxenda), semaglutide (Wegovy or Ozempic) and tirzepatide (Mounjaro or Zepbound). The medications are supplied via partner pharmacies. In Australia, Juniper does not publicly advertise any medicines by name prior to consultation, due to advertising restrictions.

== Relationship with Eucalyptus Health ==
Juniper is part of Eucalyptus Health's portfolio of healthcare brands, alongside Pilot, Kin, Software and Compound.

By 2025, the United Kingdom had become Eucalyptus Health's largest market. During this time, there was a period of medication shortage (notably Ozempic) so Eucalyptus temporarily paused new Juniper memberships in the UK to prioritise supply for existing patients, resuming uptake once supply constraints eased.

In March 2025, Eucalyptus generated approximately A$200 million in revenue over the preceding 18 months from weight-loss services and medications across its brands, with revenue rising 55 per cent year-on-year to A$120.9 million. This growth aligned with improved supply of GLP-1 medications alongside the company's expansion in several international markets.

In May 2025, Eucalyptus entered early discussions for an A$100–150 million funding round, positioning the company for a valuation exceeding A$1 billion (unicorn status). Eucalyptus became one of Australia's largest online weight-loss medication providers and its growth attracted both investor interest and regulatory scrutiny.

== Business model ==
Juniper is identified as part of a vertically integrated healthcare model in the Australian telehealth sector. Its clinical consultations, prescribing and medication delivery are offered within a single online platform. This model has drawn regulatory attention over advertising practices and conflicts between commercial incentives and clinical decision-making. Regulators emphasise that prescribing decisions remain the responsibility of individual clinicians.

== Regulatory scrutiny ==
Juniper's growth and marketing practices have attracted public, professional and regulatory attention globally.

=== Australia ===
From 2023, Juniper was cited in multiple reports examining the regulation of telehealth-based weight-loss services in Australia. The Royal Australian College of General Practitioners (RACGP) and medical regulators raised concerns about prescribing models relying on asynchronous or questionnaire-based assessments for injectable weight-loss medications. The TGA assessed whether online advertising by Juniper (and its competitors) could indirectly promote prescription-only medicines in breach of federal law. Between 2022 and 2024 they requested the removal of thousands of unlawful advertisements. In response to updated guidance from the Medical Board of Australia (MBA) restricting "tick-and-flick" prescribing, Eucalyptus Health said that its platforms would comply with requirements for real-time clinical consultation and enhanced verification.

In July 2023, the TGA opened an investigation into whether email communications sent by Juniper to people on its contact list about the availability of Ozempic constituted unlawful advertising.

Through 2024, the TGA proposed the removal of GLP-1 medicines from pharmacy compounding exemptions due to concerns that telehealth prescribing models were inconsistent with exemptions intended for individual patient use. They warned that compounded GLP-1 products were not subject to the same safety, quality, or adverse-event reporting requirements as TGA-approved medicines. Juniper was one of the companies prescribing them. Subsequently, the Australian government banned pharmacy compounding of GLP-1 medicines, requiring all providers to transition their patients to approved commercial products.

In November 2024, Australian regulators and medical experts examined whether advertising by Juniper could indirectly promote prescription-only medicines in breach of the TGA rules. It referred to the use of "medical weight-loss programs" without naming specific drugs, in their advertising. Clinicians and eating-disorder advocates called for stricter oversight of direct-to-consumer marketing in the sector.

In 2025, Juniper was among providers whose promotional activity was flagged, including the use of Black Friday sales campaigns and social media engagement. Professional commentary raised concerns about the potential misuse of GLP-1 medications among patients with eating-disorder vulnerabilities. The Australian Health Practitioner Regulation Agency (AHPRA) confirmed that it had taken disciplinary action against individual healthcare practitioners for inappropriate prescribing of GLP-1 receptor agonists to patients, including the issuance of cautions and conditions on registration. During the same period, the TGA requested the removal of more than 3,000 online advertisements for weight-loss medicines, issuing infringement notices for unlawful advertising in September 2025, and releasing updated social-media advertising guidance in November 2025.

=== United Kingdom ===
In November 2023, Juniper was among several UK-registered online providers continuing to prescribe Ozempic for weight loss during a national shortage of semaglutide.

The Advertising Standards Authority (ASA) issued an advice notice to Juniper over advertisements implying endorsement by National Health Service (NHS) workers. There were concerns about misleading claims and the promotion of prescription-onlu medicines. The ASA launched multiple investigations into online advertising by weight-loss providers, including Juniper.

In June 2025, Juniper was among providers examined after test purchases showed weight-loss injections could be obtained following online questionnaires without real-time consultation.

In September 2025, the growing private market for GLP-1 weight-loss medications in the UK had raised concerns about a two-tier system of access, with most users paying privately due to limited NHS availability. Juniper was offering private access to weight-loss treatments, while clinicians and public-health experts warned that cost barriers could exacerbate health inequalities and limit access for lower-income patients.

== Clinical governance ==
In January 2024, Eucalyptus appointed former Australian deputy chief medical officer Nick Coatsworth as a clinical governance adviser following scrutiny over the prescribing of compounded semaglutide.

== Technology and AI ==
In July 2025, Eucalyptus Health announced a partnership with AI healthcare platform Amigo to integrate AI-powered health agents into its telehealth services, including an AI assistant deployed for the Juniper weight management clinic. The AI tools were intended to support functions such as patient triage, care coordination and health coaching alongside clinician-led care.

Juniper introduced an AI chatbot, June, to provide automated guidance on topics such as nutrition, medication use, and weight-loss plateaus. Mental-health and psychology experts cautioned that AI use in weight-management services required strong safeguards to avoid risks to vulnerable patients, including those with eating-disorder histories.
