= Hims & Hers Health =

American telehealth company

Hims & Hers Health, Inc.
- Type: Public
- Traded as: NYSE: HIMS (Class A); S&P 400 component
- Industry: Online pharmacy; Telehealth
- Founded: 2017; 9 years ago
- Founders: Andrew Dudum; Hilary Coles; Jack Abraham; Joe Spector
- Headquarters: San Francisco, California, United States
- Area served: United States; United Kingdom; Australia
- Key people: Andrew Dudum (CEO); Yemi Okupe (CFO); Mike Chi (CGO); Melissa Baird (COO)
- Products: Personal care; Mental health services
- Revenue: ▲US$2.348 billion (2025)
- Operating income: ▲US$105.6 million (2025)
- Net income: ▲US$128.4 million (2025)
- Total assets: ▲US$2.155 billion (2025)
- Total equity: ▲US$540.9 million (2025)
- Number of employees: 2,442 (2025)
- Website: hims.com

Hims & Hers Health, Inc., doing business as hims, is an American telehealth company headquartered in San Francisco. It provides prescription medications, over-the-counter medications, and personal care products through a direct-to-consumer subscription model.

== History ==
=== Early history (2017–2020) ===
Hims, Inc. was founded in November 2017 by Andrew Dudum, Jack Abraham, and Hilary Coles as part of Atomic Labs, a San Francisco venture studio co-founded by Dudum and Abraham. It initially offered generic prescription treatments for erectile dysfunction and hair loss alongside skincare products, marketed to millennial men through a direct-to-consumer brand. Hims received $7 million in seed funding from investors including Kirsten Green of Forerunner Ventures and Josh Kushner's Thrive Capital.

In 2018, Hims launched Hers, a brand targeting women's health needs including birth control, skincare, and hair regrowth treatments. In January 2019, Hims raised $100 million in a Series C funding round at a $1 billion pre-money valuation. Later that year, the company expanded internationally with a launch in the United Kingdom.

In April 2020, amid the COVID-19 pandemic, Hims & Hers expanded into mental health with a rollout of free anonymous group therapy sessions, later adding online psychiatry consultations and, in 2021, individual teletherapy services.

=== SPAC merger, public listing, and acquisitions (2020–2023) ===
In October 2020, Hims announced an agreement to become a publicly traded company through a merger with Oaktree Acquisition Corp., a special-purpose acquisition company led by Oaktree Capital Management co-chairman Howard Marks. The transaction closed on January 20, 2021 at a valuation of $1.6 billion, and shares began trading the following day on the New York Stock Exchange. The deal provided the company with about $280 million in proceeds, including $75 million from private placement investors such as Franklin Templeton Investments.

In June 2021, Hims & Hers acquired London-based Honest Health Limited, marking its first international acquisition and expanding its United Kingdom operations. The following month, the company acquired the teledermatology platform Apostrophe (YoDerm, Inc.) for potential consideration of up to $200 million. Apostrophe was shut down in 2025.

=== GLP-1 weight loss entry and Super Bowl advertising (2024–2025) ===
In May 2024, Hims & Hers began offering access to compounded injectable semaglutide, a glucagon-like peptide-1 receptor agonist (GLP-1) prescription treatment, as part of a new weight-loss specialty on its platform. The move followed a national shortage of branded semaglutide products Ozempic and Wegovy made by Novo, which allowed Section 503A compounding pharmacies and 503B outsourcing facilities to legally produce copies of the drug. In September 2024, the company acquired MedisourceRx, a licensed 503B compounding outsourcing facility, to vertically integrate its compounded medicine supply chain.

In February 2025, Hims & Hers aired a 60-second commercial titled "Sick of the System" during Super Bowl LIX on Fox, the first Super Bowl advertisement to promote GLP-1 weight loss treatments. The advertisement drew criticism from public health experts, industry trade groups and members of the United States Congress for framing the compounded semaglutide products as a solution to the American obesity epidemic without disclosing side-effect or risk information. Senators Dick Durbin and Roger Marshall wrote a joint letter to the Food and Drug Administration urging enforcement action.

=== Novo collaboration and termination (2025) ===
In April 2025, Hims & Hers announced a collaboration with Novo under which branded Wegovy would be made available through the Hims & Hers platform as a bundled offering with a monthly membership. On June 23, 2025, Novo unilaterally terminated the collaboration, citing what it described as "deceptive promotion and selling of illegitimate, knockoff versions of Wegovy that put patient safety at risk," in reference to Hims & Hers' continued sale of compounded semaglutide. Shares of the company fell roughly 35% following the announcement, and multiple securities class action lawsuits were subsequently filed in the United States District Court for the Northern District of California alleging that the company had misled investors about the risk of the partnership's collapse.

=== Regulatory scrutiny and international expansion (2025–2026) ===
In June 2025, Hims & Hers acquired the London-based European digital health platform ZAVA for undisclosed cash consideration, extending the company's presence into Germany, France, and Ireland alongside deeper reach into the United Kingdom.

In August 2025, Bloomberg reported that the Federal Trade Commission had been investigating the company's advertising claims and subscription cancellation practices for more than a year. On September 9, 2025, the FDA sent Hims & Hers a warning letter as part of a broader enforcement effort targeting more than 100 drug advertisers, faulting the company for statements on its website claiming that its compounded products contained "the same active ingredient" as FDA-approved Ozempic and Wegovy.

On February 5, 2026, Hims & Hers introduced a compounded oral semaglutide pill for the first month, undercutting Novo's newly approved branded oral Wegovy pill. Novo announced its intention to sue the company for patent infringement related to U.S. Patent No. 8,129,343, which protects the semaglutide molecule until December 2031. On February 7, 2026, Hims & Hers announced it would withdraw the compounded oral pill from its platform. Novo formally filed the patent infringement suit in the United States District Court for the District of Delaware on February 9, 2026.

On February 19, 2026, Hims & Hers announced an agreement to acquire the Australian digital health company Eucalyptus Health, operator of the Juniper, Pilot, and Kin telehealth brands, for consideration of up to $1.15 billion.

Following the completion of the Eucalyptus acquisition, Hims launched in Australia on 1st September 2026, initially offering men's health treatments and weight-loss medication, including branded GLP-1 products. Alongside the launch, the company began retiring Eucalyptus's Pilot men's-health brand and rebranding under the Hims name. The company announced that it would transition existing Pilot clinicians to its platform and plans to introduce women's health services in Australia later in 2026 through their existing Juniper brand.

== AI Technology ==
In 2026, chief technology officer Mo Elshenawy described the rollout of an AI-assisted service for Hers weight-loss customers, combining AI coaches, clinicians and customer support in a single conversation. He said the system used clinical guidelines encoded in software, automated evaluation of AI responses, and escalation to human clinicians.
