= Jack Abraham =

American businessman

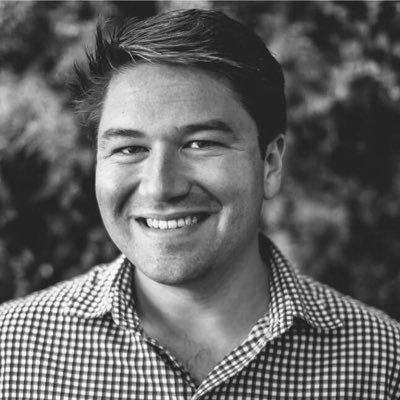
- Born: February 23, 1986 (age 40)
- Education: The Wharton School
- Occupations: Managing Partner at Atomic, Co-Founder at Hims & Hers Health
- Known for: Founder and Managing Partner of Atomic
- Website: Atomic

Jack Abraham is an American businessperson and investor who is managing partner of startup studio and investment fund Atomic.

== Career ==
In 1999, at the age of 13, Abraham began working summers, nights, and weekends at Comscore, a marketing analytics company co-founded by his father Magid Abraham.

In 2004, after working for his father, Abraham enrolled in the Wharton School at the University of Pennsylvania in Philadelphia, studying technical entrepreneurship. Three years later, in 2007, Abraham dropped out of Wharton to start a local product search engine company, Milo.com.

Abraham then went on to be Head of Local at eBay. During his tenure, Abraham led the creation of the news feed for the site as well as "brought an entrepreneurial mindset to eBay."

In 2012, Abraham started Atomic Labs, a San Francisco-based startup studio and venture capital investment firm. With limited partners including Peter Thiel and Marc Andreessen, Atomic started with an initial fund of $20 million and has raised additional funds including $260 million in 2021. Atomic has started dozens of companies, including Replicant, Homebound, Exowatt and Hims & Hers Health. Abraham is also the co-founder of Hims, which achieved a $1B valuation just 15 months after launch, making it the second fastest company to a $1B valuation in history.

In 2020, Abraham moved to Miami and has been credited with spurring others in Silicon Valley tech to move to Miami. Abraham opened an Atomic office in the Wynwood neighborhood's The Annex. The Annex also houses OpenStore, an Atomic-backed company that Abraham co-founded with Founders Fund’s Keith Rabois.

Abraham is also an angel investor in Pinterest, Postmates, Uber, and other companies and ventures. He was named one of the "100 Most Creative People in Business" by Fast Company and has also been named to the Forbes' 30 Under 30 listing twice. Abraham was formerly the executive director of the Thiel Fellowship.
