= Lux Capital =

American venture capital firm

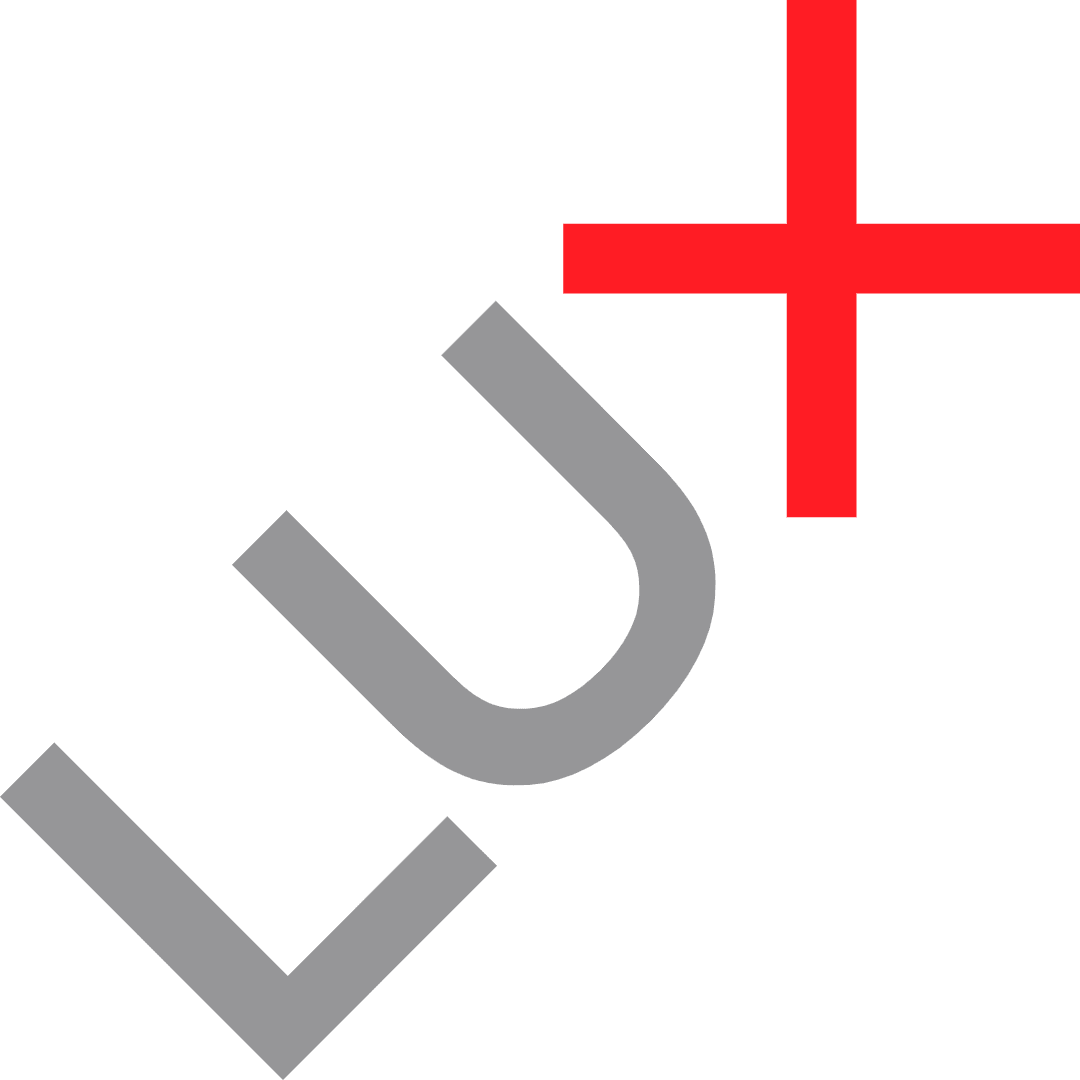
- Logo
- Type: Private
- Industry: Venture capital
- Founded: 2000; 26 years ago
- Founders: Peter Hébert; Robert Paull; Josh Wolfe
- Headquarters: New York, NY, United States
- Total assets: $7.0 billion
- Website: luxcapital.com

Lux Capital is a venture capital firm based in New York City. Founded in 2000, it focuses on investments in emerging technologies.

== History ==
Lux Capital was founded in 2000 by Peter Hébert, Robert Paull and Josh Wolfe. The firm's first outside investor was Carlyle Group co-founder Bill Conway.

Lux Capital was an early investor in nuclear waste cleanup company Kurion, which aided in the cleanup of the Fukushima nuclear accident in 2011. In 2016, Kurion was acquired by Veolia, French nuclear cleanup specialist, for $350 million.

In 2017, Lux Capital helped fund the seed round for defense technology company Anduril Industries, a manufacturer of unmanned aerial systems, robotic submarines, and counter-drone technologies, which have been deployed in military operations and border surveillance. Anduril has drawn scrutiny for selling its products to the U.S. Customs and Border Protection agency.

The organization had raised approximately $1 billion in investment funds by August 2019. In 2004, Lux Capital founded Lux Research, with Lux Capital's co-founder Peter Hebert leading the spin-off, making Lux Research a portfolio company initially backed by the firm. Lux Research was later sold to Bregal Sagemount in 2017, creating a historical link rather than an active parent-child relationship.

In 2020, Lux Capital joined a group of technology companies for an additional round of funding for Anduril Industries. Also in 2020, retired 4-star General and former commander of U.S. Special Operations Command (USSOCOM) Tony Thomas joined the firm as a Venture Partner.

By June 2021, it had raised approximately $1.5 billion in investment funds.

In 2023, Lux Capital raised its eighth core fund, with $1.15 billion. The fund invests in early-stage technology companies in the areas of life sciences, defense, manufacturing, aerospace, and artificial intelligence. This brought the company’s total assets under management to over $5 billion. To date, Lux has invested in over 200 companies.

The firm has created more than 20 new companies since its founding, formalizing this process in 2024 as Lux Labs, a platform and strategy to bring scientific ideas from labs into the real-world. In May of 2025, Lux Capital developed the Lux Helpline to support the academic research of scientists who are facing funding cuts. Also in 2025, American diplomat Brett McGurk joined Lux as a venture partner.

In January 2026, Lux closed its 9th fund at $1.5 billion.

== Portfolio companies ==
=== AI and tech ===
- Cognition AI
- Hugging Face
- Runway

=== Defense, space and manufacturing ===
- Applied Intuition
- Anduril Industries
- Hadrian Automation
- Impulse Space

=== Biotech and healthcare ===
- Aera Therapeutics
- Benchling
- eGenesis
- Eikon Therapeutics

No longer operating:

- Tempo Automation

== See also ==
- Entrepreneurship
- Venture Capital
- Startup company
