= Katherine Boyle (venture capitalist) =

American venture capitalist and journalist

- Born: 1986 or 1987 (age 39–40); Gainesville, Florida, U.S.
- Education: Georgetown University (BA); National University of Ireland, Galway (MA); Stanford Graduate School of Business (MBA)
- Occupations: Venture capitalist, journalist
- Employer: Andreessen Horowitz
- Board member of: Anduril Industries; Mercatus Center
- Children: 2

Katherine Boyle (born 1986 or 1987) is an American venture capitalist and journalist. Boyle has been a general partner at Andreessen Horowitz since 2022, leading its American Dynamism fund, which invests in technology companies serving the defense and civic technology markets.

== Early life ==
Katherine Boyle was born in Gainesville, Florida, the daughter of John and Donna Boyle. Her father enrolled in medical school after dropping out of seminary, and Boyle was the youngest of six siblings and half-siblings. Boyle recalled taking an intense interest in the 1992 presidential election, which occurred during her early childhood, and developed an admiration for Condoleezza Rice's interest in both music and politics.

Boyle attended Oak Hall School in Gainesville, graduating from high school as its valedictorian in 2004. She competed in the 2003–2004 edition of the America's Junior Miss pageant, motivated by the competition's offer of scholarship money. Boyle's performance in the competition, including an original piano composition, won her the Florida state title.

== University studies and journalism work ==
Boyle studied government at Georgetown University, graduating in 2008. She wrote in a May 2008 editorial in The Hoya that her work in intellectual property during her Georgetown studies, combined with her Jesuit upbringing, had caused her to consider multiple serious moral issues. Following her graduation from Georgetown, Boyle was awarded a George J. Mitchell Scholarship to study Public Advocacy and Activism at the National University of Ireland, Galway.

Boyle worked as a reporter for The Washington Post in the early 2010s, covering culture. In a 2022 interview, she recalled that "I was not a technology reporter, but every story I was writing had something to do with technology touching old institutions." Boyle left the Post in 2014 to enroll in an MBA program at the Stanford Graduate School of Business.

During her studies at the Graduate School of Business, Boyle developed an interest in the writings of Peter Thiel; in 2022, she described Thiel's book Zero to One as "the canonical example of venture capital as philosophy." Boyle cold-emailed Thiel, who forwarded her correspondence to Trae Stephens, an early employee of Thiel's surveillance software company Palantir Technologies. Stephens had recently joined Founders Fund as a partner, and Boyle interned for Founders Fund in the summer of 2015, working on the firm's investments in defense technology startup companies.

== Early venture capital work ==
Boyle graduated from Stanford in 2016 with an MBA, and was hired by Cambridge, Massachusetts-based venture capital firm General Catalyst as an associate investor. In 2017, Boyle advocated for General Catalyst to become an early investor in Anduril Industries, a defense technology company co-founded by Stephens. Boyle wrote a 16-page memo on just war theory to support a $2 million investment in Anduril's seed round. and began developing a concept for investments in civic technology companies serving the defense, infrastructure, and education markets.

While working at General Catalyst, Boyle met future Vice President JD Vance, who was working for Thiel's firm Mithril Capital at the time. She hosted a release party for his 2016 memoir Hillbilly Elegy, and has maintained a connection with him since. Vance's views on technology aligned with Boyle's, and she recalled in a 2025 interview that Vance was one of "only a handful of people saying these things in 2016 or 2017."

Boyle met Andreessen Horowitz partner David Ulevitch in 2019, as their respective firms competed for further investments in Anduril. The two firms eventually agreed to co-lead a Series B round in Anduril. Boyle was promoted to partner at General Catalyst in 2020, and was appointed as the head of a new civic technology line of business in early 2021. Boyle moved to Miami to lead the business, intentionally placing herself outside of technology industry hubs such as the San Francisco Bay Area and Austin, Texas.

== Work with Andreessen Horowitz ==
Boyle departed General Catalyst in late 2021, and joined Andreessen Horowitz shortly afterwards. Margaux MacColl, writing for The Information, reported that Boyle's move to Andreessen Horowitz was motivated by her disagreement with General Catalyst's unwillingness to invest in automatic license-plate recognition company Flock Safety.

In early 2022, Boyle was appointed as a general partner at Andreessen Horowitz. She leads its "American Dynamism" fund alongside Ulevitch. Much like her earlier work, the American Dynamism fund invests in technology startups in the defense, education, and infrastructure markets. The firm announced an additional investment of $600 million in the American Dynamism fund in 2024. According to Fortune, Boyle, who "runs the arm of a16z that invests in aerospace, defense, and infrastructure", is a co-founder of the American Dynamism fund.

Boyle joined the board of directors of the Mercatus Center at George Mason University in 2023, and also serves on the board of Anduril.

== Viewpoints and analysis ==
Boyle published an essay in connection with the 2022 launch of the Andreessen Horowitz American Dynamism fund, detailing her views on its concept. Boyle argued in the essay that "the only way to reverse the course of stagnation and kickstart nationwide renewal post-Covid is through technologists building companies that support the national interest."

In a 2023 Politico interview, Boyle expressed an appreciation for political philosophy literature, saying that "I think we can learn more about what the future will look like from Aristotle or Plato than from the greatest science fiction authors. On technology, I'm a fan of the work of Kevin Kelly, who starts much of his writing from a place of understanding what human flourishing is."

Boyle responded to questions about the ethics of her investment in military technology in a 2024 Fortune interview, where she argued that "It's making sure that the war of the future doesn't happen, and if it does happen, that it happens as quickly as possible or in as precise a way as possible."

Boyle detailed her views on family and technology in a February 2025 keynote speech at an American Enterprise Institute event, which was later was published in Tablet magazine. The AEI's journal The New Atlantis published a compilation of responses to her speech in its summer 2025 issue, featuring arguments from commentators including Christine Rosen and Patrick Deneen.

Rosen, senior editor of The New Atlantis and a senior fellow at the AEI, criticized Boyle's arguments about the intersection of technology and family values. Rosen "Unless and until we center human values and human virtues ... we are not having the conversations that matter. I hear little about human values and human virtues in Boyle's remarks, beyond her noting that families are important."

Deneen, a political theorist who taught Boyle in her undergraduate studies at Georgetown, argued that her thesis of technology aiding family values "elides recognition of how various technologies have arguably been more effective in undermining and even displacing the family than even the authoritarian regimes she rightly deplores." Deneen contrasted Boyle's philosophy with 20th-century sociologist Robert Nisbet's commentary on technology and social groups, and further argued that Boyle's proposed technological solutions "ultimately rely upon the assistance of the very state that she otherwise denounces as hostile to the family."

Military strategy analyst Seth G. Jones remarks that what Boyle is concerned about is not the lack of cutting-edge companies but the business climate and the government's procurement system.

William D. Hartung and Ben Freeman write that Boyle and her colleague Ulevitch position the private sector as "central players in shaping the future of the planet" and push for new-age militarism without safeguards.

== Personal life ==
Boyle described herself as a "practicing Catholic" in a 2021 interview. She has three children and lives in the Miami metropolitan area.

== Selected publications ==
- "The Great Tech-Family Alliance". Tablet Magazine. March 4, 2025.
- "How to Win the Fight for America". The Free Press. November 19, 2023.
- "Building American Dynamism". Andreessen Horowitz. January 14, 2022.
