= Copperhead (UUV) =

- Type: Unmanned underwater vehicle (all variants); torpedo (M variants only)
- Place of origin: United States

Production history
- Manufacturer: Anduril Industries

Specifications
- Length: 106 inches (Copperhead-100); 163 inches (Copperhead-500)
- Diameter: 12.75 inches (Copperhead-100); 21 inches (Copperhead-500)
- Engine: Electric
- Payload capacity: 100 lb size-class (Copperhead-100); 500 lb size-class (Copperhead-500)
- Maximum speed: In excess of 30 knots
- Launch platform: Ghost Shark (Dive-XL), XL-AUV, Small+ ASV, Group 4+ AAV (Copperhead-100); XL-AUV, Medium+ ASV, Group 5 AAV (Copperhead-500)

Copperhead is a family of reusable unmanned underwater vehicles (drones) developed by Anduril. The family consists of two size classes of autonomous undersea vehicle, with both utility and "kamikaze"-style munitions (designated M) subvariants of each. The Copperhead-100M is roughly comparable in size and capability to the Mark 54 lightweight torpedo, and the Copperhead-500M is roughly comparable in size and capability to the Mark 48 heavy torpedo; however both Copperhead variants are significantly lighter and cheaper to manufacture. It is intended to supplement, rather than replace, traditional crewed submersibles and torpedoes.

== Design ==
Anduril refers to Copperhead as "High-Speed Autonomous Underwater Effects". Copperhead features a rectangular hull form, rather than the cylindrical hull shapes of the Mk54 and Mk48 torpedoes. According to Anduril, this was a deliberate decision to simplify development and reduce construction costs, as stamping out cylindrical shapes is more difficult than rectangular or square shapes. Anduril claims that this production system is intended to produce "very high hundreds to thousands of these systems a year", in comparison to legacy torpedoes which are produced in much smaller volumes annually. The system was specifically designed for an expected conflict with the People's Republic of China, which Anduril expects will take place on a "very wide waterfront" and will require low-cost, high-production autonomous systems and weapons effectors that can themselves be deployed from unmanned platforms where crewed vessels cannot safely operate.

Copperhead is designed to be recoverable, refurbished, and reusable, in contrast to traditional legacy torpedoes which are single use disposable platforms, which contributes to the price point being a fraction of the cost of existing traditional torpedoes. Copperhead is designed to be loaded into and deployed by larger UUVs, such as Anduril's Ghost Shark (also known as Dive-XL), which is capable of carrying dozens of Copperhead-100's in a single unit, or multiple Copperhead-500s. Launch systems aside from Ghost Shark/Dive-XL and Dive-LD are currently unknown, though Anduril has indicated that it will be deployable from other autonomous host vehicles and is considering air-launched capability. The system can be directly controlled, or programmed to autonomously make decisions on which targets to address based on the operator's parameters. Its seeking technology is capable of being upgraded through software updates alone as new threats emerge or existing threats change signatures.

== Capabilities ==
Copperhead can be configured to carry a munitions payload, active or passive sensors, magnetometers, side-scanning sonar, or chemical detection equipment. All members of the Copperhead family will feature Anduril's Lattice artificial intelligence-enabled autonomy software package, as well as other subsea communications, data-sharing, and data-processing capabilities to allow the systems to communicate with each other (via acoustic and optical technologies) in the extremely low bandwidth subsea environment. Through the Lattice system, Copperhead was designed to communicate with Anduril's Seabed Sentry series of cableless deep-sea nodes which can sense, process and communicate information in remote underwater environments. The system utilizes Anduril's communications systems that operate on low power and through very thin bandwidths.

Copperhead is intended to supplement, rather than replace, traditional crewed submersibles (for the non-munitions variants) and torpedoes (for the munitions variants). Copperhead-Ms are believed to possess some loitering capability, depending on configured mission endurance. Anduril intends to offer the non-munitions versions of Copperhead for sale in non-military contexts, such as search and rescue, inspection of underwater infrastructure, and environmental monitoring.

== Specifications ==
Specification	Copperhead-100	Copperhead-100M	Copperhead-500	Copperhead-500M
Payload size	100 lb		500 lb	
Payload capability	Active or Passive Sensing; Acoustic Comms Relay; Magnetometer; Side Scan Sonar; Chemical Detection	Lightweight-Class Warhead	Active or Passive Sensing; Acoustic Comms Relay; Magnetometer; Side Scan Sonar; Chemical Detection	Heavyweight-Class Warhead
Length	~9 ft (106 in)		~13.5 ft (163 in)	
Diameter	12.75 in		21 in	
Propulsion	Electric			
Speed	In excess of 30 knots			

== See also ==
- Ghost Shark, a similar but larger UUV from Anduril also known as Dive-XL.
