= Fubini =

Fubini is a surname. Notable people with the surname include:

- David Fubini, American business lecturer and writer, son of Eugene Fubini
- Eugene Fubini (1913–1997), American defense official, son of Guido Fubini, and father of David Fubini
- Guido Fubini (1879–1943), Italian mathematician, father of Eugene Fubini
- Sergio Fubini (1928–2005), Italian theoretical physicist

== See also ==
- Fubini's theorem, a theorem in measure theory named for Guido Fubini
- 22495 Fubini, a minor planet named for Guido Fubini
