= Transition to and from Hostilities =

Transition to and from Hostilities is a 2004 report by the Defense Science Board, a committee of civilian experts appointed to advise the U.S. Department of Defense on scientific and technical matters. The report was the foundation for a subsequent Department of Defense Instruction that elevated Operations Other Than War (OOTW) to co-equal status with combat operations.

== Overview ==
The report made two key recommendations. First, that the management discipline demonstrated by United States Armed Forces in combat operations should be extended to peacetime work, post-conflict stabilization and intelligence in pre- and post-conflict phases of defense activities. Second, that additional capacity was required within United States Department of Defense in order to deliver the stabilization, reconstruction and intelligence tasks required in pre- or post-stabilization phases of Defense operations.
