= Eugene G. Fubini Award =

Award by the Defense Science Board

The Eugene G. Fubini Award is an award by the Defense Science Board, named after Eugene G. Fubini, on an annual basis to recognize an individual from the private sector who has made highly significant contributions to the Department of Defense in an advisory capacity over a sustained period of time.

Also in honor of Dr. Fubini, the National Defense Industrial Association (NDIA) presents a different Fubini Award recognizing the NDIA C4ISR Person of the Year.

== Nominations ==
Service Secretaries, Chairman of the Joint Chiefs of Staff, and the General Staff of the Secretary of Defense, and the members and former members of DoD Advisory Boards and Committees may submit candidates for consideration for this award. Recognized advisory bodies include the Army Science Board, Naval Research Advisory Committee, Air Force Scientific Advisory Board, Defense Science Board, Defense Policy Board, Defense Business Board, Defense Intelligence Agency Advisory Board, Threat Reduction Advisory Committee, and the Intelligence Science Board.

== Criteria ==
Nominees will have contributed recommendations relating to ideas, methods, or processes which reflect exemplary advice across the broad spectrum of the DoD mission. Innovations are expected to meet the needs of the warfighting and peacekeeping communities faster, better, and cheaper; improve the acquisition system; or strengthen the commercial and defense industrial base.

== Past winners ==
- 1996 Eugene G. Fubini
- 1997 No award presented
- 1998 John S. Foster, Jr.
- 1999 Joseph Braddock
- 2000 Norman R. Augustine
- 2001 Charles A. (Bert) Fowler
- 2002 David R. Heebner
- 2003 Larry D. Welch
- 2004 Robert Hermann
- 2005 Craig Fields
- 2006 James Burnett
- 2007 Theodore Gold
- 2008 Robert R. Everett
- 2009 James R. Schlesinger
- 2010 Daniel J. Fink
- 2011 No award presented
- 2012 Richard Wagner
- 2013 Larry Lynn
- 2014 Robert Stein
- 2015 Mim John
- 2016 Vince Vitto
- 2017 James Tegnelia
- 2018 William Schneider Jr.
