= Trae Stephens =

American venture capitalist and entrepreneur (born 1983)

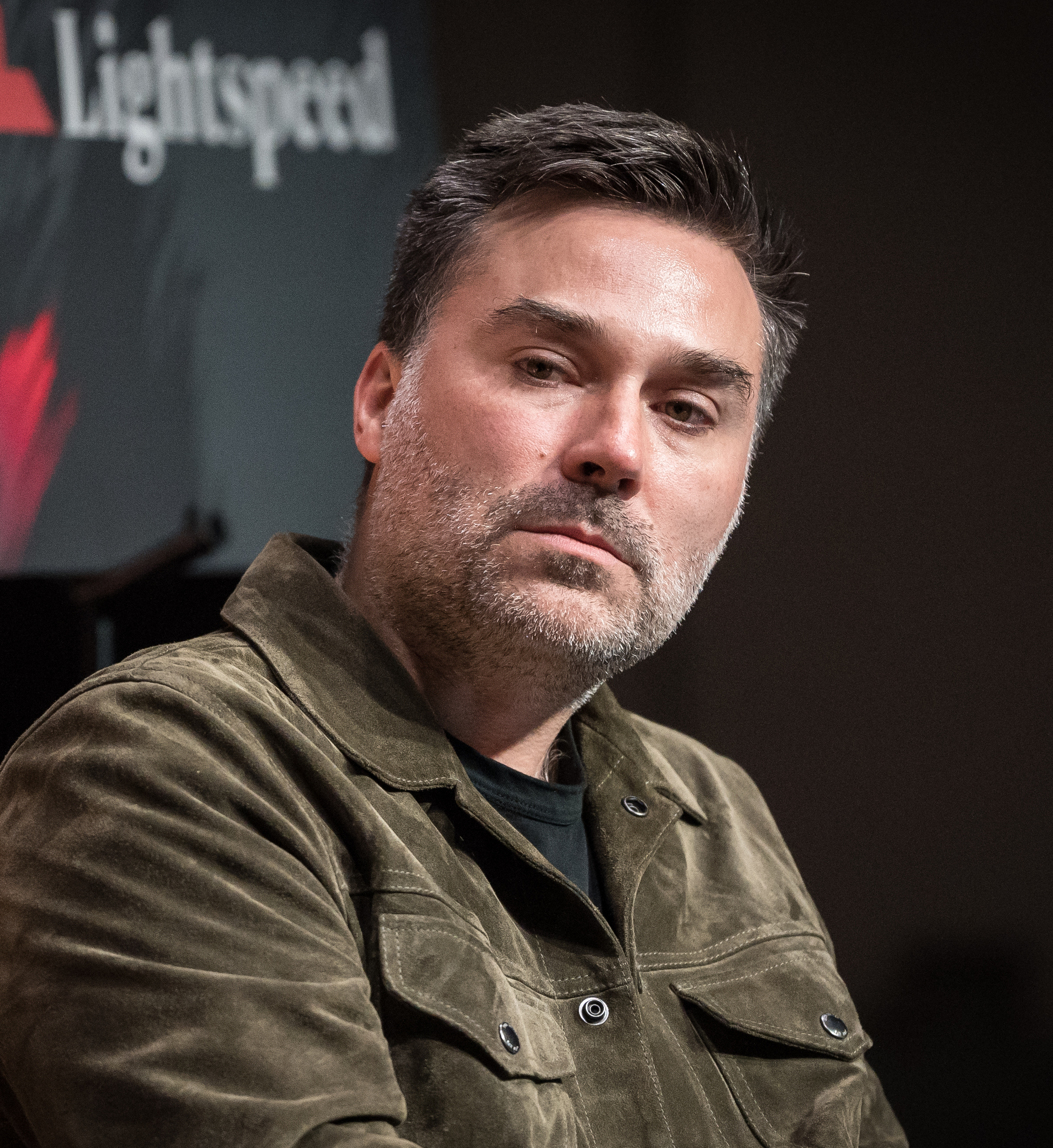
- Stephens in 2024
- Born: November 1983 (age 43)
- Education: Georgetown University
- Known for: Co-founder and chairman of Anduril Industries; Co-founder of Sol; Co-founder of Varda Space Industries; Co-founder of Valinor Enterprises
- Spouse: Michelle Stephens
- Children: 2

Trae Stephens (born November 1983) is an American venture capitalist and entrepreneur. He is a co-founder and executive chairman of Anduril Industries, a defense technology company. He is a partner at Peter Thiel's venture capital firm Founders Fund and an early Palantir employee. As of June 2025, Stephens is a billionaire.

== Early life ==
Trae Stephens grew up in Lebanon, Ohio. He was a senior in Lebanon High School at the time of the September 11 attacks, an event which inspired him to pursue a career in national security. Stephens attended Georgetown University’s School of Foreign Service, where he focused on Arabic and Security Studies and earned a degree in Regional and Comparative Studies (Middle East) in 2005.

During his college years, he gained early experience in government and international affairs. He interned in the office of Republican congressman Rob Portman and at the Embassy of Afghanistan in Washington, D.C., shortly after the establishment of Hamid Karzai’s post-Taliban transitional government.

== Career ==
After graduating from Georgetown, Stephens began his career in computational linguistics working within the US Intelligence Community. He does not disclose the name of the specific agency he worked for. He worked as "a computational linguist building enterprise solutions to Arabic/Persian name matching and data enrichment". He said, "I'd say twenty percent of my time was literally just running searches and merging database files. This was taking up a full day out of every week. I thought I was going to show up and it would be this James Bond thing –they'd give me a supercomputer and the keys to an Aston Martin. Instead, it was a joke." In 2008, he joined the Silicon Valley data analytics firm Palantir Technologies as one of its early employees. He led teams focused on expanding business in the defense and intelligence sector, on international growth, product development, and helped design analytical software. He served briefly as an adjunct faculty member at Georgetown University.

According to tech writer Mario Gabriele, when Stephens was at Palantir, Alex Karp, the CEO, told him that he would not let Stephens meet Thiel because he would be poached from Palantir. Karp managed to keep the two separated for two years, until 2012. Stephens began to work for the Founders Fund in 2013. It is known that he has a close relationship with Thiel at the Founders Fund.

In 2014, he became a partner at Founders Fund, where he has focused on investments in startups in the government and defense technology. In late 2016, Stephens served on then-President-elect Donald Trump’s transition team, where he led the Department of Defense transition effort.

In 2017, Stephens co-founded Anduril Industries alongside Palmer Luckey, the founder of Oculus VR, and fellow former Palantir colleagues Matt Grimm, Joe Chen, and Brian Schimpf. The idea for Anduril arose in 2014, when Stephens met Luckey at a Founders Fund retreat; they bonded over the idea of applying Silicon Valley startup techniques to the defense sector. Anduril (named after a legendary sword in The Lord of the Rings) set out to build advanced autonomous weapon systems and autonomous surveillance technology.

The company’s first major project was a “virtual border wall”, a network of sensor towers and drones designed to detect unauthorized crossings on the U.S.–Mexico border. Under Stephens's and Luckey's leadership, Anduril quickly expanded its product line to include counter-drone systems, autonomous aircraft, and other AI-driven defense hardware. As chairman of Anduril, Stephens has helped the company secure significant contracts with the Department of Defense and allied nations. By early 2024, the company was valued at approximately $8.4 billion.

In 2020, he co-founded Varda Space Industries with Thiel fellow Delian Asparouhov and former SpaceX engineer Will Bruey. He also sits on the board of directors.

In 2021, he co-founded Sol (at one point Sindarin Inc.), which developed a next-generation wearable e-reader device.

In 2024, he co-founded Valinor Enterprises, a "company of companies" (incubator or accelarator), alongside former Palantir's senior vice president Julie Bush, General Catalyst's Paul Kwan and Red Cell's Grant Verstandig. Each of Valinor's product comes with its own product company, which acts as a lean subsidiary of Valinor's. In a year (from its 2024 founding to 2025), Valinor has launched 10 such product companies. It has also launched Valinor Streamline, "the first third-party application installable in Palantir Foundry". Valinor participates in Anduril's Lattice Partner Program, and the two companies are also members of the Defense Industrial Base Consortium. Valinor's announced products include a mobile field hospital named Harbor and a mobile drone charging station named Dispatch.

Anduril, Sol, Varda and Valinor were incubated or co-incubated by the Founders Fund. Among these companies, Sol is the sole non-military company.

Stephens also sits on the board of Flexport.

He is a commissioner at the Atlantic Council Commission on Software-Defined Warfare.

He served as federal advisory committee member on the Defense Innovation Board (DIU) chaired by Eric Schmidt and co-authored a software acquisition study for the DIU in 2019.

The outlet Newcomer remarks that Stephens "has done as much as anyone to bring military technology into the venture capital mainstream.

In June 2025, Stephens became a billionaire following Anduril's Series G fundraising round.

== Personal life ==
Stephens is married and has two sons. In a 2024 TechCrunch interview, he mentioned that his wife has made him promise never to run for public office, despite his involvement in government advisory roles. He is also personally interested in prepping: in the same interview, Stephens revealed that he has built an emergency bunker and keeps a survival kit.

He describes himself as Christian, and in June 2024 he garnered attention for preaching a sermon to a gathering of tech entrepreneurs about the intersection of Christian faith and innovation.

His wife founded ACTS 17 (Acknowledging Christ within Technology and Society), a Christian nonprofit to minister to elites. After Peter Thiel gave a speech at her husbands 40th birthday in 2023, she realized "ministering to elites is just as important as Christian teachings about ministering to the poor." ACTS 17 funded Peter Thiel's 2025 lectures on the antichrist and events by Garry Tan, featuring Pat Gelsinger. Stephens has spoken openly about the influence of his personal beliefs on his professional endeavors.
