= Anduril Industries =

American defense technology company

Anduril Industries, Inc.
- Type: Private
- Industry: Defense
- Founded: April 20, 2017; 9 years ago
- Founders: Palmer Luckey; Trae Stephens; Matt Grimm; Joe Chen; Brian Schimpf
- Headquarters: Costa Mesa, California, U.S.
- Key people: Brian Schimpf (CEO); Trae Stephens (chairman)
- Revenue: c. US$2.2 billion (2025)
- Number of employees: 7,000 (2026)
- Website: www.anduril.com

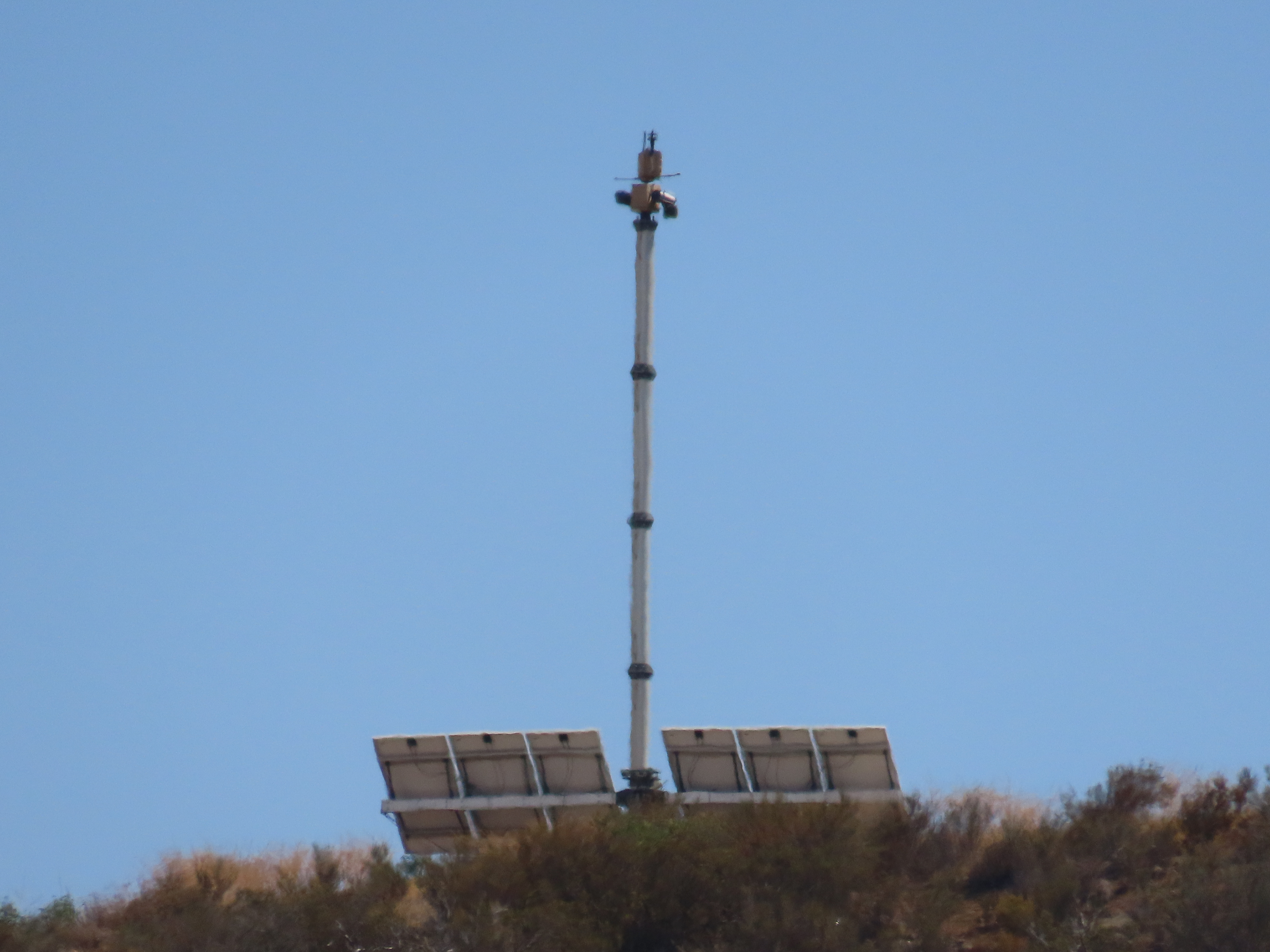
An Anduril Standard Range Sentry Tower in California

Anduril Industries, Inc. is an American military technology company specializing in the development of advanced autonomous systems. The company was founded in 2017 by Palmer Luckey, Trae Stephens, Matt Grimm, Joe Chen, and Brian Schimpf. Anduril sells systems to the U.S. Department of Defense which incorporates artificial intelligence and robotics. Anduril's major products include unmanned aerial systems (UAS) and counter-UAS (CUAS), semi-portable autonomous surveillance systems, and networked command and control software. It is privately owned.

In January 2025, Anduril announced a series of Arsenal projects, hyperscale manufacturing facilities designed to manufacture advanced autonomous weapons systems faster than near-peer American geopolitical rivals. The first, termed Arsenal-1, is undergoing construction near Columbus, Ohio, in concert with Ohio State University as of late 2025 and early '26. The second, termed Arsenal-2, is undergoing construction in Baltimore County, Maryland, in concert with the Department of Defense.

== History ==
=== Investor meetups ===
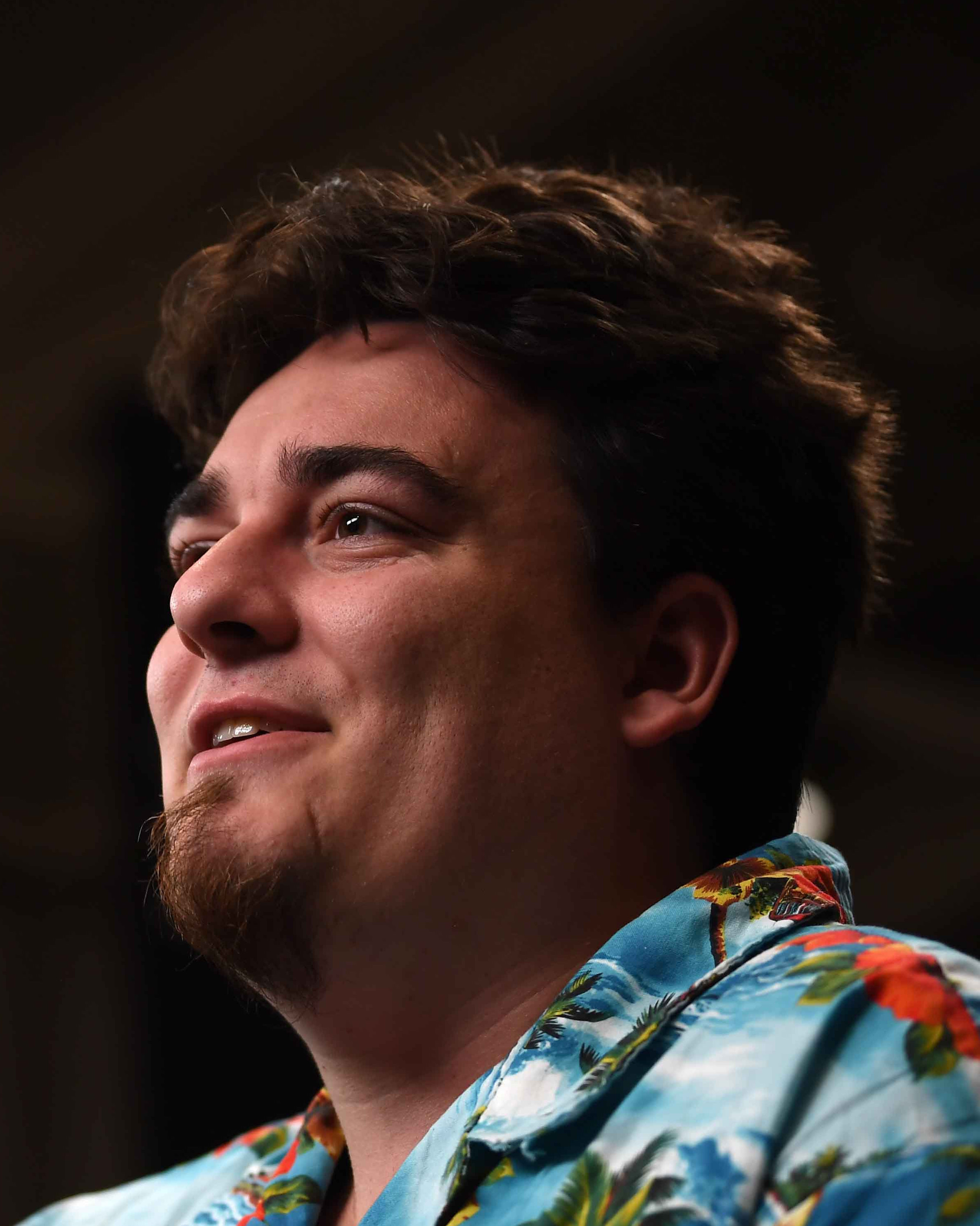
Anduril co-founder Palmer Luckey created the Oculus Rift, one of the first consumer virtual reality headsets.

In June 2014, Palmer Luckey, the creator of the virtual reality headset Oculus Rift, attended a retreat on Sonora Island, British Columbia, hosted by Founders Fund, an early Oculus investor. Luckey met Trae Stephens, 30, who had recently been persuaded to leave Palantir and join Founders Fund by its leader, Peter Thiel. Luckey and Stephens discovered a shared interest in seeking defense contracts for companies built like tech startups. "Stephens found it ridiculous almost no venture-backed companies worked closely with the government; with its billions of dollars to spend", aside from Palantir and SpaceX, the latter of which Founders Fund had been an early investor into. "Stephens' goal was to fund a company to join that duo", but found it difficult to accomplish in Silicon Valley.

In 2015, the Department of Defense and the Department of Homeland Security opened Silicon Valley offices. "In 2017, as part of an initiative which began the previous year, the Defense Department unveiled the Algorithmic Warfare Cross-Functional Team, known as Project Maven, to harness the latest AI research into battlefield technology, starting with a project to improve image recognition for drones operating in the Middle East."

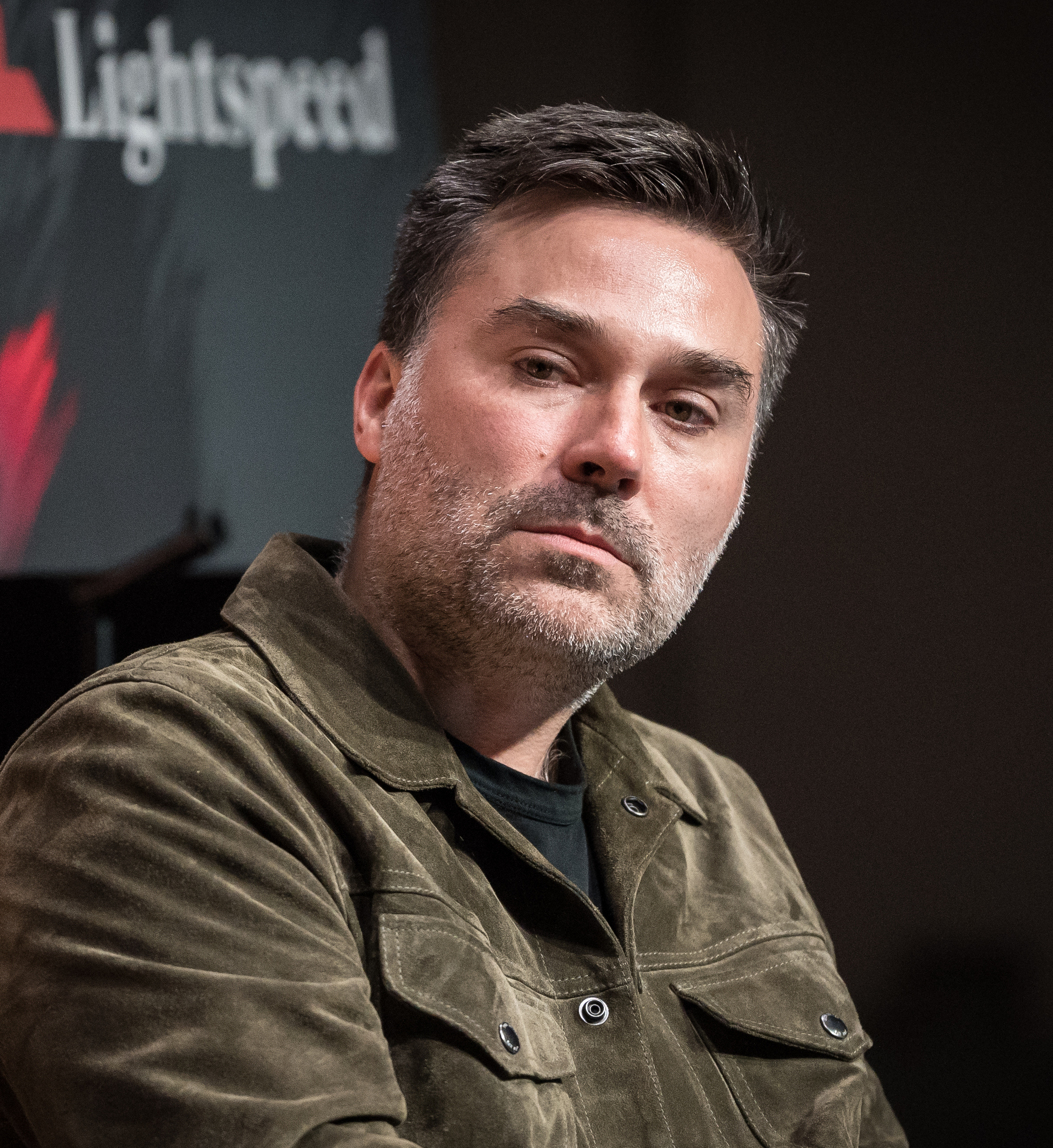
Anduril co-founder Trae Stephens in 2024

The idea for a software startup in the realm of high-technology military applications was raised by Stephens and some of his colleagues at Palantir. After the 2016 presidential election, Stephens was appointed to the Defense transition team and later joined the Defense Innovation Board, a central part of a reform effort spearheaded by Ashton Carter, defense secretary under President Barack Obama. Stephens, who was also looking for a defense startup Founders Fund could invest in, began to recruit employees for Anduril alongside Luckey, who was looking to make use of the money he obtained from selling Oculus VR to Facebook in 2014 for $2 billion.

Luckey left Facebook in March 2017, alleging he had been fired for his pro-Trump beliefs, which Facebook denies. Stephens and Luckey recruited employees from Palantir and Oculus, and planned to employ Luckey's developmental approach with the Oculus headset to combine low-cost hardware components with sophisticated software. Luckey thought this would be easy because, he said, "the defense industry has been stagnant for decades".

=== Since 2017 ===
Anduril was incorporated in April 20, 2017 and seeded by Founders Fund. There were at least four founders: Stephens, Luckey, Matt Grimm, and Joe Chen. Brian Singerman led a seed funding round. Luckey, Stephens, and Grimm pitched their company to the directors of Palantir. One of them, Brian Schimpf, decided to join, and became the fifth co-founder (and CEO)."

In June 2017, Anduril executives contacted the Department of Homeland Security (DHS) California office to pitch low-cost border security. DHS introduced them to border officials. The San Diego Customs and Border Protection (CBP) office eventually paid Anduril to test a new border system.

In June 2018, Lattice surveillance towers were informally tested on a Texas rancher's private land. Lattice was operated remotely by an Anduril technician. CBP worked on pilot programs with Anduril in Texas and San Diego.

In June 2019, the UK Royal Navy purchased Lattice as part of a modernization initiative. Anduril also signed a contract with the Royal Marines. In 2019, advocacy group Mijente reported a $13.5 million Marine Corps contract to install Anduril systems at military bases in Japan and the United States, including one that abuts the Mexico–United States border. In 2019, more towers were installed in CBP's San Diego sector. CBP ordered more for Texas, and started a pilot program at Montana and Vermont border sites for a cold-weather variant. In a September 2019 funding round, Anduril secured US$120M in funding from various venture capital firms, including Founders Fund, General Catalyst, and Andreessen Horowitz. The company was valued at over US$1 billion at the time, a four-fold increase from its 2018 valuation.

In July 2020, Anduril received $200M in funding from venture capital firms, including Andreessen Horowitz and Founders Fund, for U.S. military projects. A company representative said the company's valuation increased to $2 billion. The Post reported that Anduril had received around $28M for unclassified contracts, a small amount in the defense industry. In July 2020, Anduril's annual revenue was estimated at $100M. Also In July, CBP and Anduril entered a five-year $25M contract to deploy sentry towers for CBP. In September, Anduril received another $36M from CBP for surveillance towers. CBP planned to install 200 towers by 2022. In October, Google began integrating Google Cloud technology with Anduril technology to help AI implementations by CBP's Innovation Team. In 2020, Anduril was one of more than 50 companies selected by the U.S. Air Force to help develop the Advanced Battle Management System (ABMS) under a contract worth up to $950 million.

In February 2021, The Times reported that the Royal Marines had been testing Anduril's Ghost drone to provide video of targets for frontline use. In April, Anduril acquired Area-I, a company producing drones capable of being launched from larger aircraft. Area-I had previously contracted for U.S. government agencies, including the Army, Air Force, Navy, and NASA. Area-I was an Atlanta-based technology startup which developed surveillance drones for government clients. It was founded by aerospace researchers from the Georgia Institute of Technology, and was funded largely through government contracts, including SBIR. In June, Anduril announced $450M in Series D funding from Andreessen Horowitz, 8VC, Founders Fund, General Catalyst, Lux Capital, Valor Equity Partners, and D1 Capital Partners. This increased their valuation to $4.6bn, double that of July 2020. The funding round was led by investor and entrepreneur Elad Gil. In July, the BBC reported that the Royal Navy had used Ghost drones in an autonomous drone test to provide live feeds of targets. Anduril signed three contracts of almost £8M with the UK Ministry of Defence in 2021.

In June 2022, Anduril entered a contract with the United Kingdom Home Office titled 'CCTC – Common Operating Picture and Command Interface (COPCI)', valued at £16,087,370; it was renewed at £21,086,291 as of 2025. As part of this contract, at least fourteen Maritime Sentry Towers have been identified between Hastings and Ramsgate.

In September 2023, Anduril engineers tested a live warhead on the Altius-700M. Anduril said that the "system was accurate and effective against the chosen target".

In January 2024, Anduril was one of five vendors contracted by the US Air Force for the development of collaborative combat aircraft. In April 2024, the U.S. Army Defense Innovation Unit selected Anduril to develop a software framework, for robotic combat vehicle payloads. In August Anduril raised $1.5 billion in series F funding led by Founders Fund and Sands Capital, valuing the company at $14bn. The proceeds were to establish manufacturing facilities for autonomous weapons systems.

On July 12, 2024, Anduril and its executives were sanctioned by the Chinese government due to arms sales over Taiwan.

In January 2025, Anduril Industries announced plans to build a $1 billion manufacturing facility in Pickaway County, Ohio to produce weapons systems, including aerial and maritime drones equipped with its Lattice software. The Lattice platform had been selected by the U.S. Space Force in 2024 for use in surveillance networks. Anduril has also collaborated with OpenAI to enhance defence systems designed to protect military personnel from drone threats.

In June 2025, Anduril Industries raised US$2.5 billion from venture capital firms, including Founders Fund and 1789 Capital. In March 2026, Anduril was reported to raise a $4 billion round at a $60 billion valuation, led by Andreessen Horowitz and Thrive Capital.

In November 2025, Anduril and Emirati weapons company Edge Group formed the "Edge–Anduril Production Alliance", focused on autonomous weapons systems.

In May 2026, the company announced it had raised $5 billion in investment from multiple investors, including Thrive Capital and Andreessen Horowitz. The investment round valued the company at $61 billion.

== Acquisitions ==
Anduril has grown, in part, through various acquisitions of other companies developing products for the US Government:

- April 2021: Anduril acquired drone developer Area-I.
- September 2021: Anduril acquired Copious Imaging.
- February 2022: Anduril acquired Dive Technologies.
- June 2023: Anduril acquired rocket engine company Adranos, giving the company access to technology for developing solid rocket motors for missiles and space launch.
- September 2023: Anduril acquired North Carolina-based autonomous aircraft developer, Blue Force Technologies, which was developing what would become Anduril's Fury entry into the Collaborative Combat Aircraft (CCA) program.
- December 2024: Anduril acquired the radar and C2 businesses of Numerica.
- July 2025: Anduril acquired communications systems company Klas.
- October 2025: Anduril acquired American Infrared Solutions.
- March 2026: Anduril acquired space intelligence company ExoAnalytic Solutions.
- October 2026: Anduril acquired underwater acoustics company Popoto Modem.

== Products ==
=== Altius ===
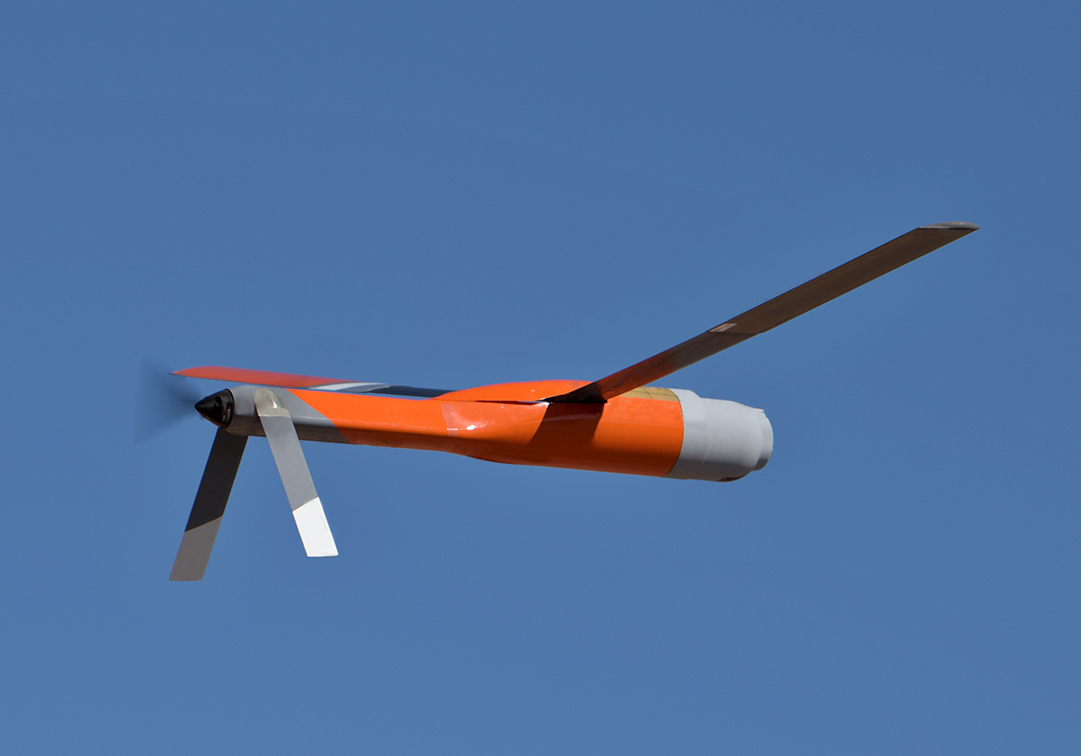
An Anduril/Area-I ALTIUS-600 Tube-Launched Unmanned Aerial System in flight

The Anduril Altius (Agile Launched, Tactically-Integrated Unmanned System) is a series of fixed-wing, tube-launched unmanned aerial vehicles developed by Area-I, an Atlanta-based subsidiary that Anduril acquired in April 2021. Altius 600 accepts a modular payload on the nose. It can be launched from different launchers and platforms, including C-130 aircraft, UH-60 Blackhawks, and various ground vehicles, as well as larger UAVs, including the MQ-1C Grey Eagle and Kratos XQ-58 Valkyrie stealth UCAV.

=== Anvil ===
Anvil, also known as Interceptor, (Note: Anduril's drone has been referred to as the Anvil or the Interceptor. Anduril refers to the drone as the Anvil on their website.) is an unmanned combat aerial vehicle quadcopter designed principally to attack other unmanned aerial vehicles. After launch, Anvil locates target drones using computer vision, and can be commanded to ram targets by its operator. The drone reportedly can reach speeds of up to 200 mph (320 km/h). Anduril is developing versions to attack larger targets such as helicopters or cruise missiles. Anvil can be integrated into Anduril's Lattice system.

The interceptor was conceptualized over a weekend, as a drone that could identify and ram hostile objects. After sending a video to the Pentagon of a working prototype, the U.S. military made a small order for testing. Anduril publicly announced the drone in October 2019.

As of 2019, Anduril had delivered the Anvil to the United States and United Kingdom militaries. Anduril was contracted to deploy the drone to overseas combat zones.

A detonating version called the Anvil-M was unveiled in October 2023. It uses a fire-control module and munitions payload to destroy Group 1 and 2 UAS.

=== Barracuda ===
Barracuda is a family of air-breathing cruise missiles, usually launched from fixed-wing aircraft, naval platforms and helicopters. The family consist of three variants - Barracuda-100 with range less than 160km while carrying a 16-kg warhead, Barracuda-250 with maximum range of 280 to 370km with 16-kg warhead, Barracuda-500 with a strike range of 800km with warhead of 45-kg.

=== BlueChip laptops ===
Anduril announced on 27 October, 2026 a program to build entirely US-designed and manufactured personal computers, built from 90% US sourced materials and components, with plans to increase that percentage to 100%. The company is partnering with Qualcomm, which is providing its Snapdragon X series chips. The initial generation of laptops are aimed at the US military, and Anduril has stated plans to sell to the US civilian market later.

=== Bolt/Bolt-M ===
Bolt is a 12 lb (5.4 kg) UAV that comes in military and civilian configurations. M stands for "munitions". The products operate on the Lattice AI network. They can be carried in a backpack and can be deployed in five minutes. It includes swappable batteries for extending flight time. Its primary purpose is intelligence, surveillance, and reconnaissance (ISR) and search and rescue (SAR). It has both remote and autonomous flight modes. Flight time is 45 minutes. Range is 12.4 mi (20.0 km). The operator can specify a target, and an attack angle, and then let the drone operate autonomously without further intervention.

Bolt-M carries up to a 3 lb (1.4 kg) ordnance payload. It supports both anti-personnel or anti-materiel warheads. The additional weight reduces flight time to 40 minutes.

=== Copperhead UUV ===
Copperhead is a family of autonomous underwater vehicles with both utility and "kamikaze"-style munitions capabilities, designed to be launched from the Dive-LD and Ghost Shark platforms, as well as other unmanned undersea and aerial platforms. Copperhead-100 is roughly comparable in size and capability to the Mark 54 lightweight torpedo, while Copperhead-500 is roughly comparable in size and capability to the Mark 48 heavy torpedo. Both systems are intended to be reusable and recoverable.

=== Dive-LD ===
Dive-LD is an autonomous underwater vehicle (AUV) designed by Boston-based Dive Technologies, which was acquired by Anduril in February 2022. It is intended for use in littoral and deep-water survey, inspection, and ISR. In May 2022, Anduril announced that the Royal Australian Navy signed a $100M contract to develop and build three Extra Large Autonomous Undersea Vehicles (XL-AUVs). Dive-LD is capable of carrying and deploying the Copperhead family of UUVs and Copperhead-M family of loitering munitions.

=== Dust ===
Dust is a small 4-pound (1.8 kg) ground-based sensor designed to detect people and objects in areas with limited line of sight, such as small corridors that nearby Sentry Towers cannot observe. Dust is powered by an onboard battery providing two months of life, or an external solar panel.

=== Fury ===
Fury is a long-range, subsonic, stealthy military drone with 17-foot (5.2 m) wingspan suited for surveillance and combat. The initial prototype design was originally made by Blue Force Technologies. Fury was selected alongside General Atomics to compete for the first increment of the U.S. Air Force's Collaborative combat aircraft (CCA) program in April 2024.

Anduril significantly modified the Blue Force design for the competition. The Anduril-developed YFQ-44A "Collaborative Combat Drone" is semi-autonomous, and slated to work in concert with a broad range of US military assets. The maiden flight of the YFQ-44A took place on October 31, 2025; its competitor in the US DoD competition, the General Atomics YFQ-42A, made its maiden flight in August 2025.

=== Ghost ===
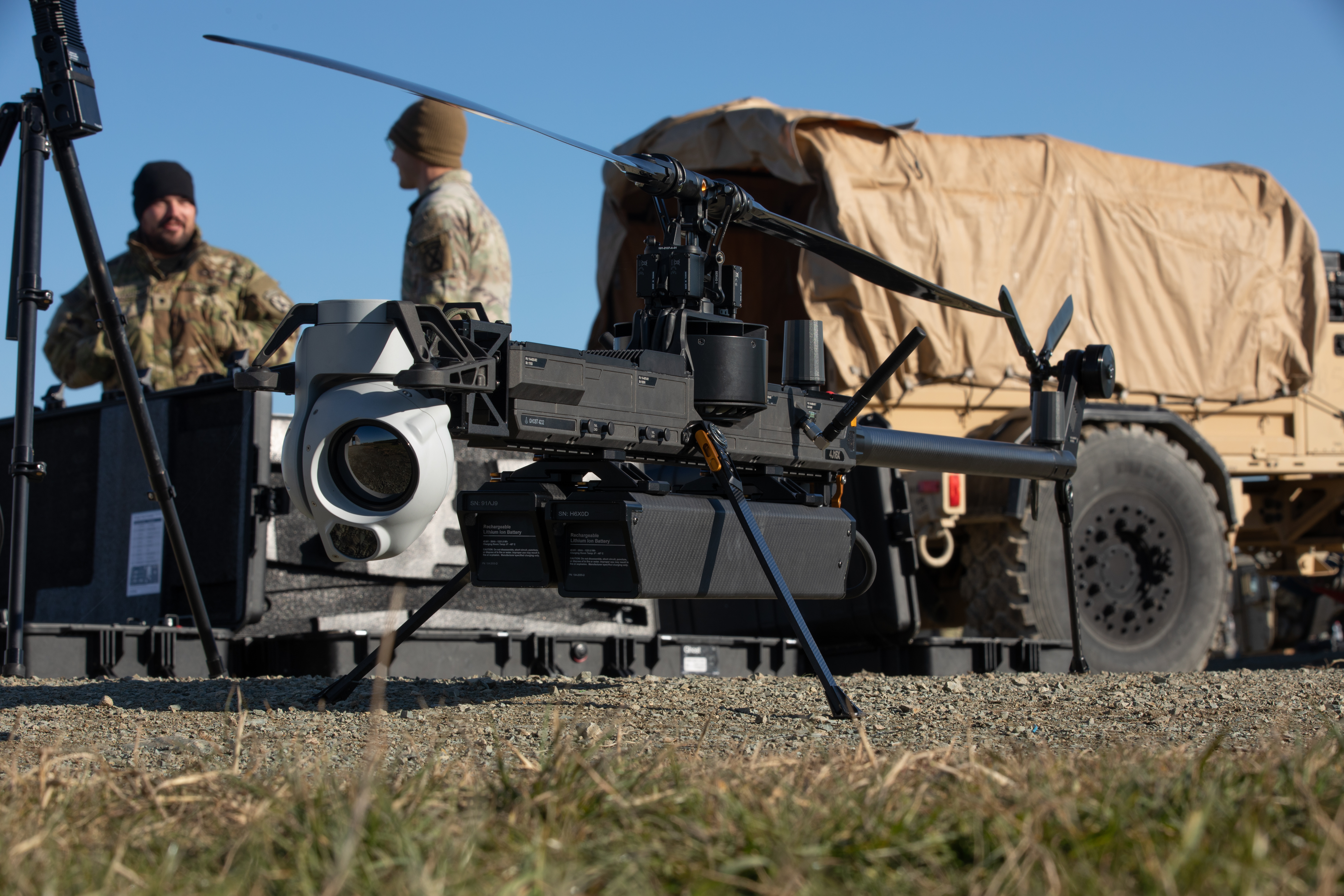
Anduril Ghost-X UAS prepared for flight near Mihail Kogălniceanu Air Base, Romania.

Ghost is an unmanned aerial vehicle. (Note: Anduril calls the Ghost a "small unmanned aircraft system" (sUAS).) The name signals its reportedly quiet acoustic signature and ability to avoid detection. Ghosts 1, 2, and 3 have been used in military operations. Information about them has not been publicly released.

Ghost 4 was announced in September 2020. Constructed using metal alloys and carbon fiber composites, it utilizes a traditional single-rotor helicopter design, which reduces noise, increases efficiency and payload compared to a multirotor design. It measures 2.725 m (8 ft 11.3 in) long when fully assembled. It can be collapsed to 1.07 m (3 ft 6 in) for transport in a backpack. Anduril claims a maximum flight time of 100 minutes, a cruise speed of 52 knots (60 mph; 96 km/h), a 35-pound (16 kg) payload capacity, and a charge time of 35 minutes. The drone can be remotely or autonomously piloted.

Machine learning and computer vision algorithms are used to identify and track targets. The drone can upload data to Anduril's Lattice system. The drone uses Nvidia processing units originally designed for self-driving cars. The drone was designed to use on-board processing chips, due to bandwidth limitations for communication links, and to enable radio silence, by processing imagery independently without the need for a centralized analysis system that requires communication. An onboard camera provides a live feed for operators. Luckey claims it can track and image, in high-resolution, objects up to 2,520 feet (770 m) away. (Note: Luckey claims that the Ghost "could track an object and capture detailed images from seven football fields away". One football field is 360 feet (110 m) long, so seven football fields are 2,520 feet (770 m) long in total.)

Ghost can perform multiple roles due to its five modular payload bays, such as utilizing laser weapons or detecting and tracking cruise missiles. Anduril claims that payloads can be swapped out in minutes. Multiple Ghosts can reportedly link up, using a conventional rule-based system to form a 'swarm', to relay data among themselves to increase effective range to a Lattice station. Ghost 4 features improved weatherproofing. Its rotor system was also overhauled.

Users of previous Ghost iterations include the United States Department of Homeland Security and Customs and Border Protection. The United States Department of Defense and the Ministry of Defence used Ghost 3. The Royal Navy tested Ghost for use on the frontline. The U.S. Army selected the Ghost X in September 2024 to fulfil the first tranche of the Company-Level Small UAS Directed Requirement; the Ghost X has a flight time of 75 minutes and a range of 25 km (16 mi).

=== Ghost Shark (XL-AUV) ===
Ghost Shark is an autonomous submarine developed by Anduril Industries. Anduril contracted with the Royal Australian Navy and the Defence Science and Technology Group in May 2022 to produce three prototypes over three years. The submarine is known as the XL-AUV outside of Australia.

On 31 October 2025, Anduril opened a Ghost Shark manufacturing facility in Sydney, with the first production vehicle completing assembly ahead of schedule and cleared for sea acceptance testing. The first Ghost Shark extra-large autonomous underwater vehicle was delivered to the Royal Australian Navy in November 2025, ahead of schedule. Prototype testing was underway as of April 2024, with Anduril officials reporting that the vehicle had already spent significant time at sea. Ghost Shark is capable of carrying and deploying "dozens" of Copperhead-100 class UUVs (or Copperhead-100M loitering munitions) and "multiple" Copperhead-500 class UUVs (or Copperhead-500M loitering munitions).

=== Lattice ===
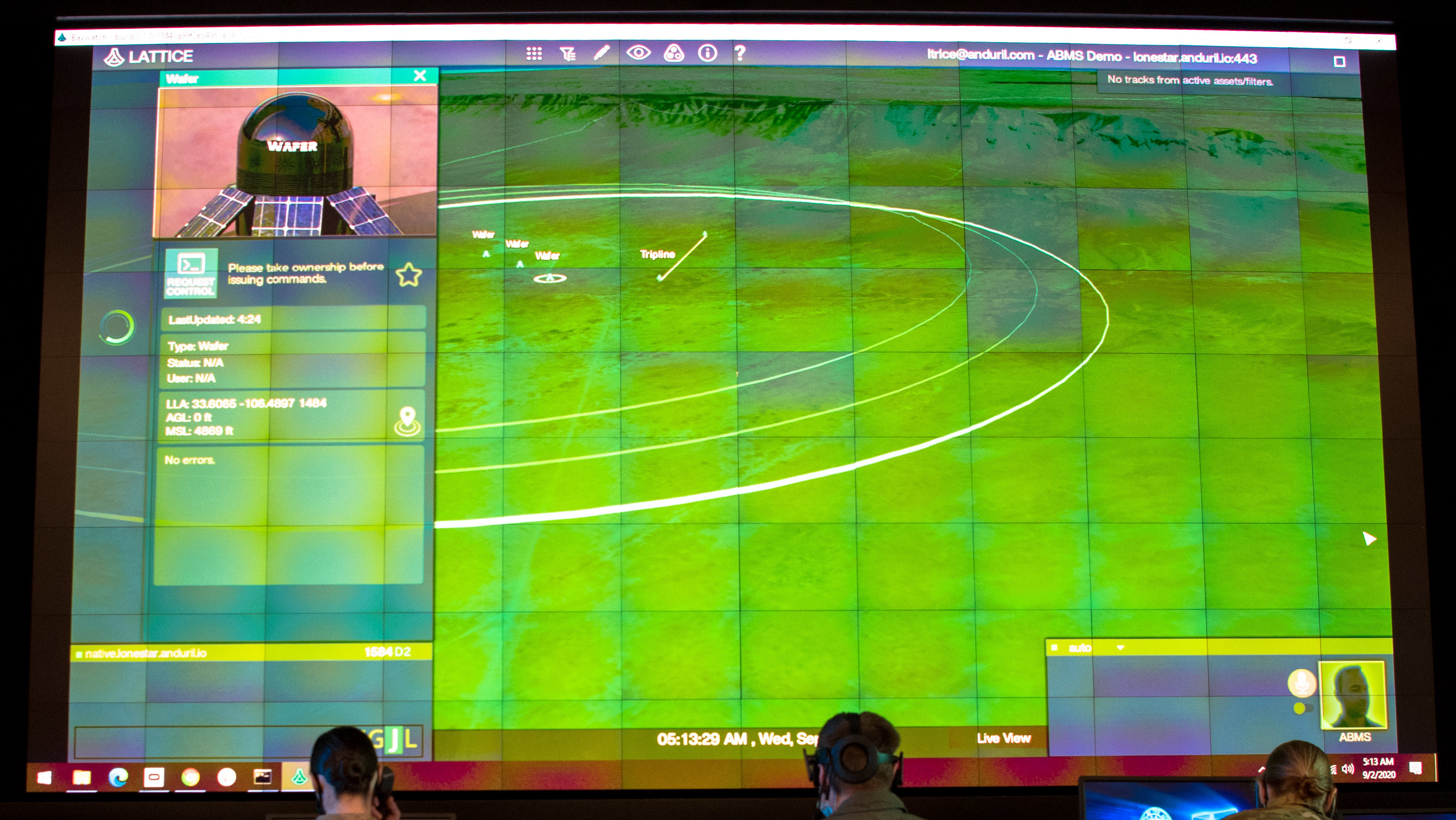
Lattice at a 2020 field test of the Advanced Battle Management System

Lattice is a software platform that uses artificial intelligence to classify objects by fusing data from disparate sensors, including Anduril platforms and those of third parties. It is the core of all other Anduril products.

Lattice has been used to control Anduril equipment for national border and military base surveillance. As of 2023, there are 290 surveillance towers installed by Customs and Border Protection (CBP) along the US border with Mexico.

Anduril demonstrated Lattice in a September 2020 exercise, simulating shooting down Russian cruise missiles in the White Sands Missile Range in New Mexico, as part of the United States Air Force's Advanced Battle Management System (ABMS) program, which aims to reduce response time delays after initial data acquisition. During that exercise, Lattice ingested data from Air Force systems and missile detection towers to track potential missiles and alert users. The system displayed a map of the area in an Oculus virtual reality headset. Users could tag the missile as hostile, triggering Lattice to offer potential response options.

Military clients access the system using a laptop or phone.

=== Roadrunner ===
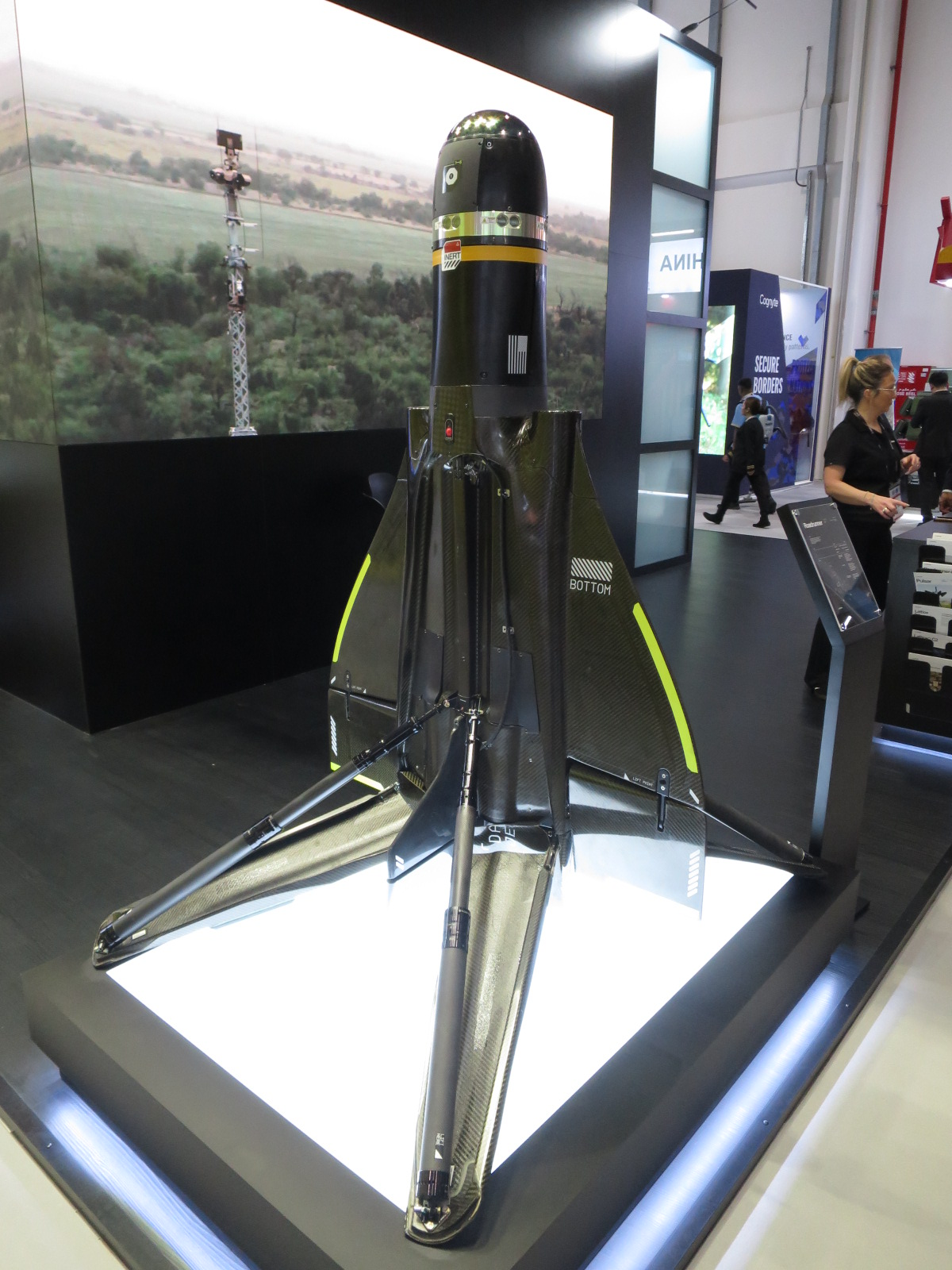
Anduril Roadrunner

Roadrunner is a 6 ft (1.8 m)-long twin turbojet-powered delta-winged craft capable of high subsonic speeds and extreme maneuverability. Company officials describe it as somewhere between an autonomous drone and a reusable missile. The basic version can be fitted with modular payloads such as intelligence and reconnaissance sensors. The Roadrunner-M has an explosive warhead to intercept UAS, cruise missiles, and manned aircraft. Both models can take off and land vertically from a dedicated container, and the munition version can be recovered if not detonated. Although specifications are not public, it is purported to have three times the warhead payload, three times the maneuverability under g-forces, and 10 times the one-way range of comparable air vehicles.

Anduril revealed the Roadrunner in December 2023, saying that it had been in development for two years, and that they were about to begin low-rate production for an order of "hundreds of units" from a U.S. customer. A single unit costs "in the low hundreds of thousands of dollars" but the price is expected to drop as volumes increase. The name came from its competitor, RTX Corporation's Coyote Block 2, in reference to the Wile E. Coyote and the Road Runner cartoon characters.

=== Sentry Tower ===
Sentry Tower is a 33-foot (10 m) tall solar-powered portable surveillance tower. Sentry contains a camera, communications antennae, radar, and thermal imaging. The tower operates autonomously, and feeds data into Lattice. When disassembled, Sentry can fit into a pickup truck, and reportedly can be re-assembled in under an hour. CBP says agents can set up an individual system in under 2 hours. Sentry Tower and associated systems such as Lattice have been referred to as a "virtual border wall", a more sustainable and economical alternative to a fixed border wall. or "smart wall".

The U.S. government has been seeking digital border security tools since the 1990s. It spent $429M on two unsuccessful development programs from 1997 to 2005. The DHS SBinet program started in the mid-2000s with the goal of creating a border wall. Boeing won the contract in September 2006 for an estimated $7.6B. The system was rolled out along the Arizona border, but expansion was later halted. Plagued with cost overruns, missed deadlines, and other issues, the program was canceled in 2011 after spending over $1 billion. The fault was partly pursuing a 'one-size-fits-all' approach, versus implementing systems for local requirements. Israeli defense contractor Elbit Systems had developed camera towers, but its equipment was considered more expensive and less mobile than Anduril's. Sentry Tower's smaller footprint mitigated land-use issues.

Anduril's pitch deck to its initial investors included 'perimeter security on a pole'. While Stephens was interested in developing the product for forward operating bases, Luckey thought it could be useable as border security. Anduril executives contacted a DHS office in California in June 2017, which put them in contact with border-patrol agents. Anduril quickly produced a prototype. Schimpf and other employees took the prototype to a test range. They trained software on open-source machine learning training datasets, to identify and distinguish humans from other objects.

But Luckey had an idea: Sync a laser beam to a virtual shutter, similar to flash photography. "We shoot a flash beam way, way, way out to where you are," Luckey says. "It lights up you and the area around you, and then we're able to pick that up with our electro-optical sensor." Anduril discovered it could cheaply repurpose the laser, which it bought in bulk, originally meant for a 600-watt cosmetic hair-removal device.

To image distant targets, Luckey proposed an off-the-shelf infrared laser repurposed from a hair removal device as an illumination source in a manner akin to a photographic flash, allowing Sentry Tower to capture high resolution images of distant targets. This was considered a cheaper alternative to using a thermal camera.

Stephens called U.S. representative Will Hurd (R-TX), who helped arrange an informal test of three towers in early 2018 on ranch land near the border. The towers led to 55 arrests and 982 lb (445 kg) of marijuana seized within 10 weeks of installation. An official test outside San Diego led to 10 interceptions within 12 days.

Anduril received Sentry Tower contracts from several U.S. agencies:

- CBP: Started in early 2018 with 4 towers in San Diego County. They had 60 in operation in June 2020.
  - 2019: A pilot program in Montana/Vermont for "cold-weather tower variant" and other border surveillance equipment.
  - In July 2020, CBP paid $25M for surveillance towers. In September 2020, Anduril received $36M from CBP for Sentry Towers.
- Marines: The US Marine Corps inked a July 15, 2019 $13.5M contract for Lattice/towers at 4 bases sited at Smedley D. Butler in Okinawa, Japan; Marine Corps Base Hawaii; Marine Corps Air Station Yuma in Arizona; and Marine Corps Air Station Iwakuni in Japan.
- July 2020: A DHS contract to expand its virtual border wall program, including Anduril towers, worth up to $250m overall.

=== Sentry (firefighting vehicle) ===
Sentry was proposed as an autonomous firefighting vehicle, which would repurpose an armored personnel carrier to carry water. The vehicle was developed in Oakland, California by special effects expert and former MythBusters co-host Jamie Hyneman, who subcontracted to Anduril. Despite its capabilities and advantages the project was never fielded due in large part to Union and political pressure.

=== Thunder ===
Thunder is a planned autonomous, unmanned 'attack rotorcraft', aiming to complement (and potentially replace) the work of attack helicopters, at a time when the latter are proving to be vulnerable in drone-heavy environments, designed to be a "loyal wingman" flying aside helicopters like the Apache and future Cheyenne fleet. The pair of optimum-speed tiltrotors also means that the Thunder can fly similar distances as the Bell MV-75 Cheyenne II, a tiltrotor in development by the Army with a combat range of up to 800 n.m.

Thunder was co-developed with Archer Aviation.

== Military programs ==
=== Advanced Battle Management System / Joint All-Domain Command & Control ===
ABMS is a digital architecture battlefield management system, designed to connect data across a variety of sources and weapons, including "jets, drones, ships and soldiers" The task is difficult due to the lack of data interoperability. For example, the F-22 and F-35 stealth fighters were designed with incompatible tactical datalinks. ABMS is part of Pentagon's Joint All-Domain Command & Control (JADC2), which aims to network all military assets into a single data-sharing infrastructure.

=== Integrated Visual Augmentation System ===
On February 11, 2025, Anduril took over the development and production of the Integrated Visual Augmentation System (IVAS) from Microsoft for the U.S. Department of Defense. The Army had planned to order as many as 121,000 of the devices but said the goggles had to pass high-stress operational combat tests later in the year before full production would occur.

In March 2026 when the 2025 financial year Annual Report of the Office of the Director, Operational Test and Evaluation was published it stated the Army had determined that it would not "test, produce, or field any IVAS variant systems in the future." An operational assessment (OA) scheduled for April 2025 for the IVAS 1.2 variant was cancelled.

"In July 2026, the Government Accountability Office (GAO) noted that "the Army determined that none of [the 10,000] developed [IVAS] units will be fielded" and that IVAS 1.2 will now transition to a rapid prototyping effort, Soldier Borne Mission Command (SBMC). As Congress evaluates SBMC authorizations and appropriations, it may consider the program's history and technological maturity as well as its implications for military personnel, force structure, and cybersecurity."

=== Project Maven ===
Project Maven is an initiative that started in 2018 intended to adapt AI for military purposes.

== Headquarters ==
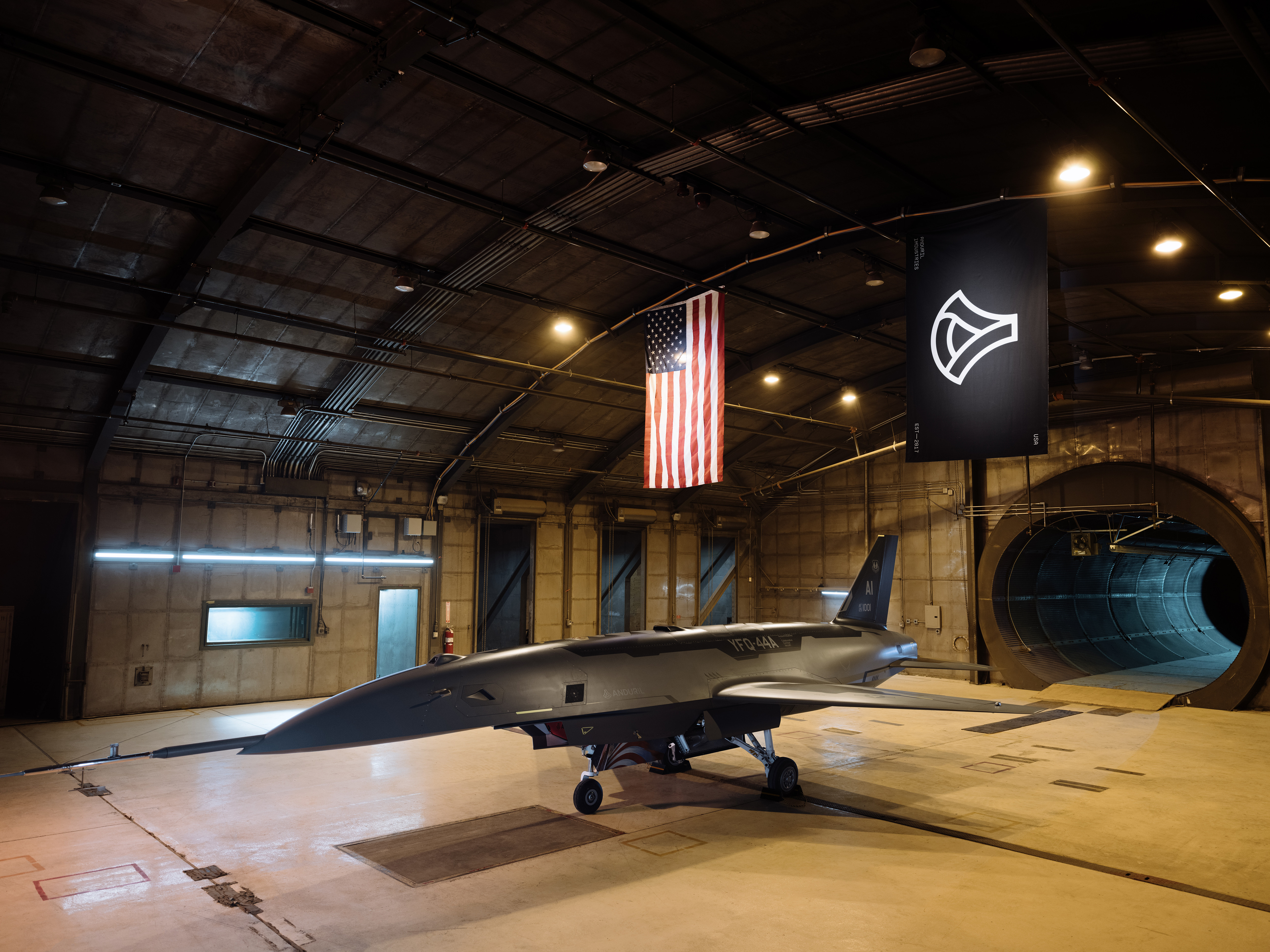
Main location in Costa Mesa, California

Anduril is headquartered in Costa Mesa, California, with satellite offices in Boston, Atlanta, Seattle, Washington, D.C., London, and Sydney. The company chose to base itself in Irvine due to its proximity to military bases and to stay away from Silicon Valley, which has been more cautious about working for the military. According to COO Grimm, Anduril's work requires in-person interaction. The company must use industrial equipment to build their products, has security requirements for classified contracts, and supplies in-person demonstrations for potential clients.

The company operates a testing range near Camp Pendleton.

=== The Press ===
In July 2018, Anduril leased a 155,000 sq ft (14,400 m^{2}) building next to John Wayne Airport, near Irvine. In February 2021, Anduril leased a 640,000 sq ft (59,000 m^{2}) campus in Costa Mesa, California. It is called "The Press" by the company, after its original occupant, the Orange County bureau and printing press of the Los Angeles Times, starting in 1968.

The Press hosts a rail line and a gas station, destined to become a company park and coffee shop, respectively. The complex is 450,000 sq ft (42,000 m^{2}). A 190,000 sq ft (18,000 m^{2}) westward expansion is intended as Anduril's research and development hub and a parking garage. Two floors will be added inside part of the existing complex. The redesign/expansion was expected to cost US$200M. Anduril planned to occupy its Costa Mesa location in 2022. (Note: In a February 2021 article in the Los Angeles Times, "Grimm said that the company plans to move from its current office in Irvine in 18 to 22 months", which is between August and December 2022. (However, though the company has moved its headquarters to Costa Mesa, it continues to operate from the Irvine location.)) The lease was the largest by size in Costa Mesa's history and the largest in Orange County's since 2006.

== Autonomous weapons facilities ==
=== Arsenal Project ===
In January 2025, Anduril announced a series of Arsenal Projects, hyperscaling computer facilities for autonomous weapons.

==== Arsenal-1 (prototype) ====
Anduril announced the construction of a manufacturing facility at Rickenbacker International Airport in Pickaway County, Ohio to be named "Arsenal-1", with subsequent Arsenals planned. This facility will be designed to be able to manufacture advanced systems faster than near peer manufacturers.

The facility is noted for its close ties with Ohio State University, with Anduril Industries sponsoring the football program for the 2025 to 2026 year, close ties to the college administration, and many of Anduril-1's employees hailing from its applied science programs.

== Corporate affairs ==
=== Development ethos ===
Luckey aims to replicate a high-tech startup in the traditionally slower-paced defense industry. Anduril has a stated goal of helping to modernize the militaries of US and its allies, in the face of "strategic adversaries", including Russia and China.

According to Wired, Anduril uses Silicon Valley-style development schemes, pre-emptively developing products for potential military markets before the Pentagon has expressed a request to purchase them. The company attempts to use commercial technologies such as AI and VR for faster iteration.

=== Military relations ===
According to Stevens, Anduril's chairman, the company is upfront about its military connections and weapons development, unlike other technology companies which seek to downplay their military involvement. The company has "unapologetically" expressed its mission, where its engineers are "openly interested" in supporting the U.S. military.

Thiel claimed that tech companies should work with the U.S. government, and less with its rivals, stating that the U.S. was behind in deploying new technologies. Luckey said in 2019 that he trusts the U.S. government and military to obey their ethical guidelines.

=== Funding ===
Investors include Founders Fund, General Catalyst, Andreessen Horowitz, 8VC, Lux Capital, Valor Equity Partners, Elad Gil, 1789 Capital, and D1 Capital Partners.

The company has signed contracts with multiple US and UK government agencies, totaling hundreds of millions of dollars.

=== Political affiliations ===
Anduril helped provide data/analysis for U.S. House Representative Will Hurd to introduce the "Secure Miles with All Resources and Technology Act" bill in the 2017 House session, whose purpose was to fund the development of surveillance equipment to monitor the US-Mexico border.

=== Employment ===
In June 2019, Anduril had around 90 employees. By February 2021, around 400 employees were at its headquarters and satellite offices. In 2024, it was reported Anduril hired more than 1,000 employees over a nine-month period.

== Criticism and controversies ==
In 2019, Bloomberg News called Anduril "Tech's Most Controversial Startup".

U.S. Customs and Border Protection's use of Anduril's sentry towers has been criticized by the ACLU and other human rights and immigration activists for pushing migrants toward ever more dangerous routes, and normalizing surveillance near the border. Similarly, the U.K. Home Office's use of Anduril's maritime sentry towers has been criticized by the Migrants Rights Network and other immigration activists.

Anduril Industries is named for Andúril, the fictional sword of Aragorn from The Lord of the Rings. Translated from the novels' constructed language Quenya, the name means Flame of the West. The use of this name for a company specialized in the production of weapons has caused some criticism, since the author J. R. R. Tolkien was notoriously opposed to war. The use of a reference to his novels in their naming has been described by many as in poor taste. Others note that the idea of the book is about the courage in protecting one's home and kin, Professor Lee Konstantinou says that there is ample materials for right-wing interpretations and the right-wing admirers do not misread Tolkien, who in Konstantinou's opinion, was "a genteel libertarian-populist and an advocate of unconstitutional monarchism". But Konstantinou says that the right is selective in their understanding and ignores the novel's "dialectical tensions and Utopian dreams".
