= Science, Technology, and Innovation Board =

The Science, Technology, and Innovation Board is a committee of civilian experts appointed to advise the U.S. Department of Defense on scientific and technical matters. Reporting to the defense undersecretary for research and engineering, it was established in 2026 by merging the department's Defense Science Board and Defense Innovation Board. As of February 2026, it is awaiting formal charter by the Federal Register.

The board's website says it is "charged with solving complex national security problems" for the defense secretary, undersecretaries, chairman and vice chairman of the Joint Chiefs of Staff, and other senior Department officials. The new board consolidates the missions of the Defense Science Board and Defense Innovation Board "to amplify their strategic value to meet critical national security challenges and ensure new technology innovations are rapidly and efficiently delivered to the warfighter".

The Defense Department announced the merger in a January 29, 2026, press release that said it "continues the transition of the Department away from the alphabet‑soup era of indecisive overlapping groups that delay results to the American warfighter".

The new board will have two subcommittees:

- Subcommittee on Strategic Options: "Charged with identifying concepts, capabilities, strategies, and courses of action across the S&T enterprise that rebalance cost and benefit, strengthen deterrence, and ensure U.S. operational dominance."
- Subcommittee on National Security Innovation: "Tasked with examining and advising on innovation pathways, emerging and disruptive technologies, commercial best practices in strategy and management, organizational design, human capital, decision‑making, and scaling — while leveraging America's broader innovation ecosystem for national security."
