= Adam Jay Harrison =

American inventor (born 1973)

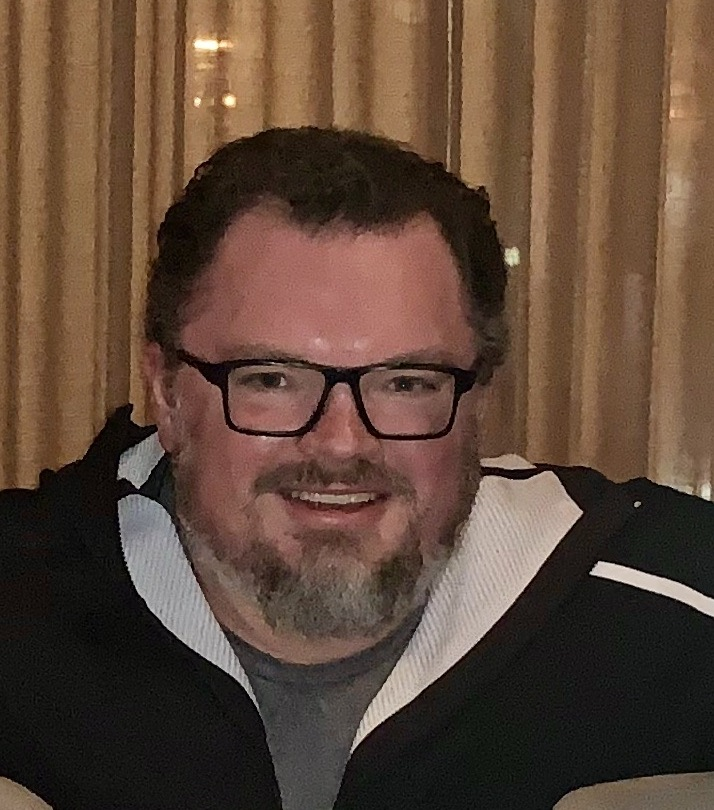
- Harrison in 2019
- Born: Adam Jay Harrison; 1973 (age 52–53); Memphis, Tennessee, U.S.
- Education: University of Memphis (B.A.); University of Florida (M.S.); Naval War College (M.A.); National Intelligence University (M.S.); New York University (Ph.D.)
- Awards: Army Greatest Inventions, Popular Science Best of What's New, Ernst & Young Entrepreneur of the Year Award
- Scientific career
- Fields: Entrepreneurship, innovation, modern warfare
- Workplaces: West Virginia University; Center for Smart Defense; Mav6, LLC; U.S. Department of Defense; New York University; MD5 National Security Technology Accelerator; National Security Innovation Network; Army Futures Command

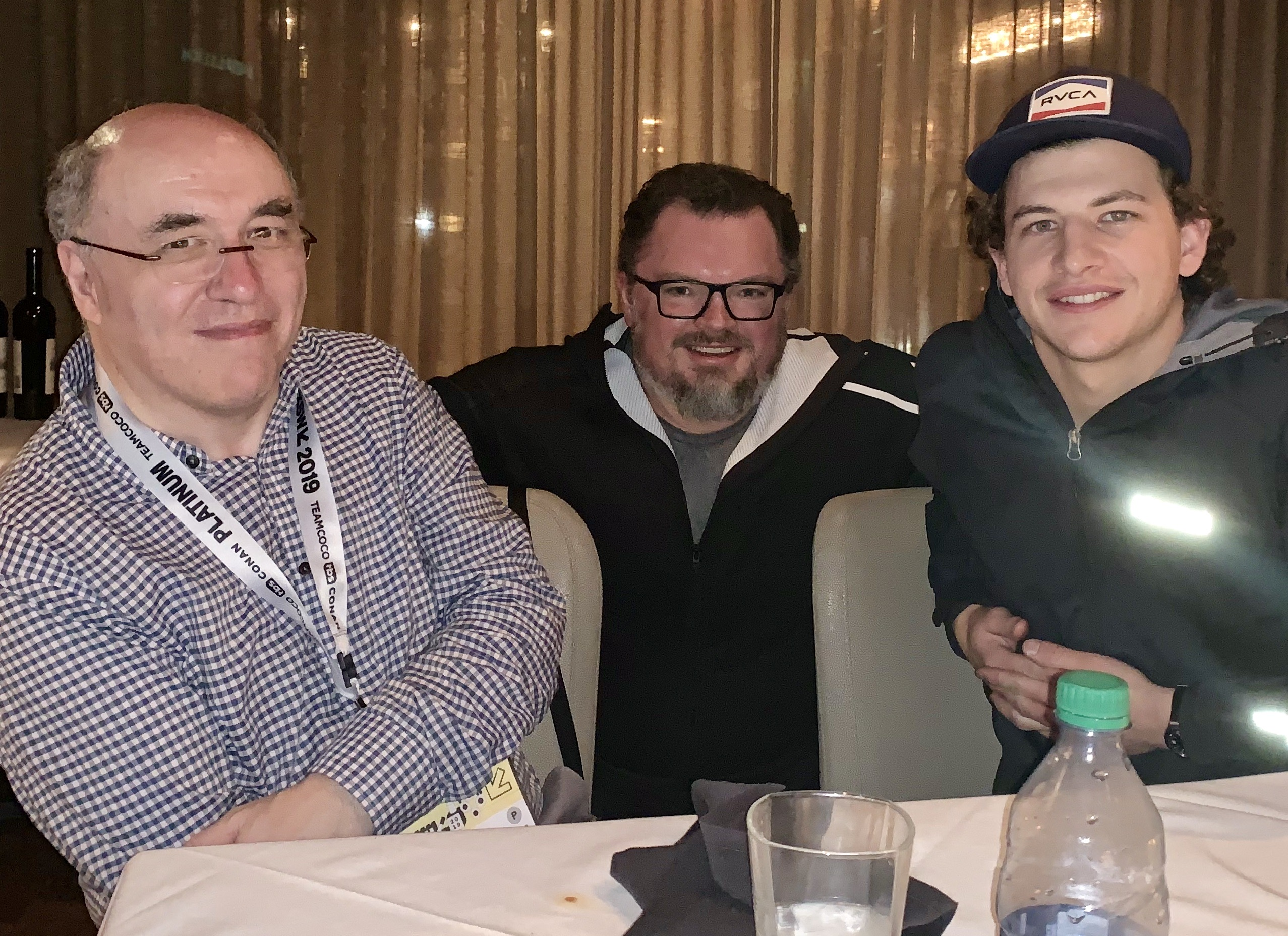
Adam Jay Harrison (center) pictured with inventor and entrepreneur, Stephen Wolfram, and actor Tye Sheridan at the 2019 South by Southwest festival in Austin, TexasX

Adam Jay Harrison (born 1973) is an American defense industry entrepreneur, inventor, and advocate for military acquisition reform. He works as a startup founder and investor and is the John R. Boyd National Security Innovation Fellow at New York University, where he researches the efficacy of national innovation policies that capitalize on collaboration between the public and private sectors. In 2006 Harrison founded Mav6, a defense technology company recognized by Inc. magazine in 2011, 2012, and 2013 as one of the fastest growing privately held companies in America. From 2016 to 2017 he served as the inaugural director of the MD5 National Security Technology Accelerator (now the National Security Innovation Network), a human capital innovation program within the Office of the Secretary of Defense and part of the Defense Innovation Unit. And from 2018 to 2019 he was the Command Innovation Officer of the US Army Futures Command, where he designed and implemented the organization's efforts to collaborate with the civilian high-tech sector in the development of advanced, military-relevant capabilities.

== Early life and education ==
Harrison was born in Memphis, Tennessee. He attended Vanderbilt University and graduated magna cum laude from the University of Memphis with a Bachelor of Arts degree in 1995 and then went on to earn master's degrees from the University of Florida, the Naval War College, and the National Intelligence University. He attended but did not complete the Master of Business Administration program at the Wharton School of the University of Pennsylvania and is a Ph.D. candidate at the New York University.

== Career ==
In 2002 Harrison was selected by the United States Office of the Secretary of Defense and the Department of the Army to lead the Technical Operations Support Activity (TOSA), a secretive military organization created in 2003 chartered with finding and repurposing commercial technologies for sensitive military missions. Harrison arranged for TOSA personnel to be embedded with operational military units in Afghanistan, Iraq, and around the world to observe military and counter-terrorism operations, resulting in a number of revolutionary products delivered to the battlefield in the early phases of Operation Enduring Freedom and Operation Iraqi Freedom. During Harrison's tenure, the United States Army awarded Army Greatest Invention recognition to three TOSA programs - the Unattended Transient Acoustic MASINT System (UTAMS) (2004), the Persistent Threat Detection System (2005), and the Constant Hawk aerial surveillance system.

In 2006, Harrison left the military and co-founded Mav6, LLC, where he served as managing director and chief technology officer from 2006 to 2014. By 2011 Mav6 was earning about $120 million in annual revenues and had won three Inc. 500/5000 awards by creating collaborations between academia, industry, and military organizations. In 2011, Popular Science named one of Harrison's projects, the M1400 airship, as a top innovation of the year, and in 2012 Ernst & Young recognized Harrison as the Entrepreneur of the Year in the Gulf Coast Region.

In 2010, working as an advisor in the office of the Assistant Secretary of Defense for Research and Engineering, Harrison co-developed a process called "technology domain awareness", which matches new technologies with national security and public safety needs.

In December 2011, Harrison co–founded the Center for Battlefield Innovation, part of the High Performance Computing Collaboratory at Mississippi State University, to provide a focal point for applying university-based research to problems in defense and public safety. In March 2014, Harrison was named the first director of the Center for Smart Defense at the West Virginia University. In 2015 he was appointed distinguished visiting research fellow at the National Defense University and the John Boyd National Innovation Research Fellow at New York University.

In 2016, Harrison founded the MD5 National Security Technology Accelerator, a partnership between the United States Department of Defense and several American universities. He served as the inaugural director from 2016 to 2017. As part of his work at MD5, he promoted the development of dual-use technology startups that address critical national security issues and pioneered the use of hackathon and crowdsourcing approaches to prototype new military capabilities. In 2018, Harrison served as senior innovation advisor to the Army Futures Command Task Force, where he developed the innovation strategy for the Army's Future Force Modernization Enterprise. On July 1, 2018, Harrison was appointed Command Innovation Officer at the Army Futures Command in Austin, TX. In this position, his work has focused on expanding opportunities for startup-derived products to transition to formal Army programs and leveraging soldier insights as a basis for new military capability development.

== Research ==
Harrison conducts research on the management of technology and innovation as it relates to the national security enterprise and the intersection of national security, entrepreneurship, and technology. His work on civil-military collaboration associated with venturing and startup company development led to the creation of the MD5 National Security Technology Accelerator. He has written articles and published research for military-oriented magazines and journals, including National Defense University Defense Horizons, United States Naval Institute Proceedings, Georgetown Security Studies Review, Small Wars Journal, and the US Army War College Parameters journal.

Harrison is a regular contributor to the War on the Rocks online magazine, writing on topics related to military technology, innovation, and entrepreneurship.

== Personal life ==
Harrison is married and resides in the Washington, D.C. area. He has two daughters, Brooke and Ava.
