= Solomon J. Buchsbaum =

Polish-American physicist

- Born: December 4, 1929; Stryj, Poland
- Died: March 8, 1993 (aged 63); New Jersey, U.S.

Solomon J. Buchsbaum (December 4, 1929 – March 8, 1993) was a Polish American physicist and technologist, best known as chair of the White House Science Council under Presidents Ronald Reagan and George H. W. Bush, and as a senior executive at Bell Laboratories.

== Biography ==
Born in Stryj, Poland, Buchsbaum's parents and youngest sister were murdered in the Holocaust. He and his other sister escaped capture by the Nazis and made their way to Warsaw, where he was protected in a Catholic orphanage. There he recited Mass and became an altar boy. After the war, as a teenager, Buchsbaum made his way to Canada where he learned English and found a job in a hat factory. With no previous formal training, he won a scholarship to McGill University in physics and mathematics, there earning a bachelor's degree in 1952, and a master's degree a year later. He received his Ph.D. from MIT in 1957.

Buchsbaum's career at Bell began as a researcher on gaseous and solid plasmas in 1958. Rising through the ranks, he became vice president in charge of technology systems in 1979. In his 35 years at Bell Labs, he published 50 articles and was awarded 8 patents. Nobel Laureate Arno Penzias called him the "vice president in charge of everything else," meaning everything that was not directly phone company business.

Buchsbaum's career as a Presidential advisor began with his membership on President Nixon's Science Advisory Committee and continued with President Ford's Committee on Science and Technology. Under Presidents Reagan and George H. W. Bush he was chair of the corresponding committees. He was chairman of the Defense Science Board from 1972 to 1977.

Among other boards, Buchsbaum served on those of MIT, Stanford University, the Rand Corporation, Draper Laboratory, and the Argonne and Sandia National Laboratories.

Buchsbaum's honors included the National Medal of Science (from President Reagan) and various defense and energy department medals.

He died in 1993, in New Jersey, of multiple myeloma, after receiving a bone marrow transplant and spending more than a month in a germ-free "bubble", equipped with a telephone and fax machine so that he could conduct "business as usual".
