= National Security Innovation Network =

The National Security Innovation Network (previously named the MD5 National Security Technology Accelerator) is a United States Department of Defense (DoD) program office under the Defense Innovation Unit that seeks to create new communities of innovators to solve national security problems. NSIN partners with national research universities and the venture community to reinvigorate civil-military technology collaboration. As opposed to making investments in specific technologies, government research and development programs, or startups, NSIN focuses on human capital innovation – i.e., developing and enabling innovators and human-centered networks to solve national security problems. In support of this mission, NSIN provides tools, training, and access to DoD assets that enable entrepreneurs and intrapreneurs to develop and commercialize high potential products in the national interest.

National Security Technology and Innovation Exchange, NSTIx

== History ==
First conceived in 2015, MD5 launched on October 14, 2016 and was part of the Office of the Deputy Assistant Secretary of Defense for Manufacturing and Industrial Base Policy. MD5 was formed in partnership with the National Defense University at Fort Lesley J. McNair in Washington, D.C. As of 2018, its headquarters was in Arlington, VA.

Adam "Jay" Harrison, former founder and managing director of Mav6 LLC, served as the inaugural director of MD5 from October 2016 until January 2018. Following him was Morgan Plummer.

On May 6, 2019, the program was renamed from MD5 to NSIN as part of a reorganization in which it was transferred from being directly under the Office of the Under Secretary of Defense (Research and Engineering) into the Defense Innovation Unit.

In 2020 during the COVID-19 pandemic, NSIN held the hackathons online and started with "Seeing into the Unknown: Situational Awareness in Dense Urban Environments". More than 200 people signed up and submitted 44 concepts, 5 finalists went on to continue developing their solutions.

== Structure ==
NSIN consists of a portfolio of programs designed to build a defense innovation workforce that creates ventures relevant to both national security and high-potential civilian applications. These programs are organized in three broad categories: national service, collaboration, and acceleration.

NSIN's Collaboration portfolio connects innovators inside and outside of the Department of Defense to solve national security problems. Hacking for Defense, a university-sponsored class that teaches students to work with the DoD to better address national security challenges, was first taught at Stanford University by Steve Blank in the spring of 2016. One team from the pilot class, Capella Space, secured a combination of DoD and venture capital funding and was scheduled to send the first U.S. commercial synthetic radar satellite into orbit in 2017. Since then, Hacking for Defense has expanded to the University of Virginia, UC San Diego, Georgetown University, University of Pittsburgh, James Madison University, the University of Southern Mississippi, the University of Nebraska at Omaha, and the University of Colorado Boulder.

MD5 Hack is a series of hackathons focusing on areas of shared civil-military interest. NSIN's inaugural hackathon took place in October 2016 in Brooklyn, New York, where over 100 hackers worked to solve humanitarian assistance and disaster relief challenges faced by military personnel and first responders. NSIN Boot Camp also falls under the Collaboration portfolio. Lastly, NSIN promotes collaborative innovation virtually through an online platform, MD5.net, which includes modules for specific innovation communities, such as Marine Makers.

NSIN's Acceleration portfolio provides funding, prototyping, and infrastructure resources needed to translate high potential concepts into minimum viable products or prototypes. NSIN also sponsors FedTech, an accelerator program that pairs entrepreneurs with technologies from federal labs to conduct customer discovery and business model development. The NSIN Proof of Concept Center (PoCC) at the University of Southern Mississippi provides digital design and manufacturing resources in support of distributed prototyping. The PoCC supports the Commandant of the Marine Corps Innovation Challenges by building hardware prototypes of concepts crowdsourced from the active duty Marine community. Other Acceleration portfolio programs include the Defense Innovation Proving Ground, an effort led by the West Virginia University that furnishes DoD research and development infrastructure to startups developing technologies relevant to national security, and the Deep Tech Studio, an Innovator-in-Residence program at New York University that applies technology from DoD laboratories to real-world defense and commercial applications.

== Recognition ==
NSIN has received recognition from the highest levels of government. General Paul Selva, Vice Chairman of the Joint Chiefs of Staff, has stated, "Through programs like MD5, the defense department will continue to cultivate innovation and creative problem solving as a core leadership competence and expand opportunities to collaborate with our partners in academia and industry to solve our biggest national security challenges." NSIN was also recognized by the White House as one of the top innovation accomplishments of the Obama Administration.

== See also ==
- Defense Innovation Unit
- Defense Innovation Advisory Board
- AFWERX
- Public-private partnerships in the United States
