= Anduril Altius =

Series of unmanned aerial vehicles by Area-I

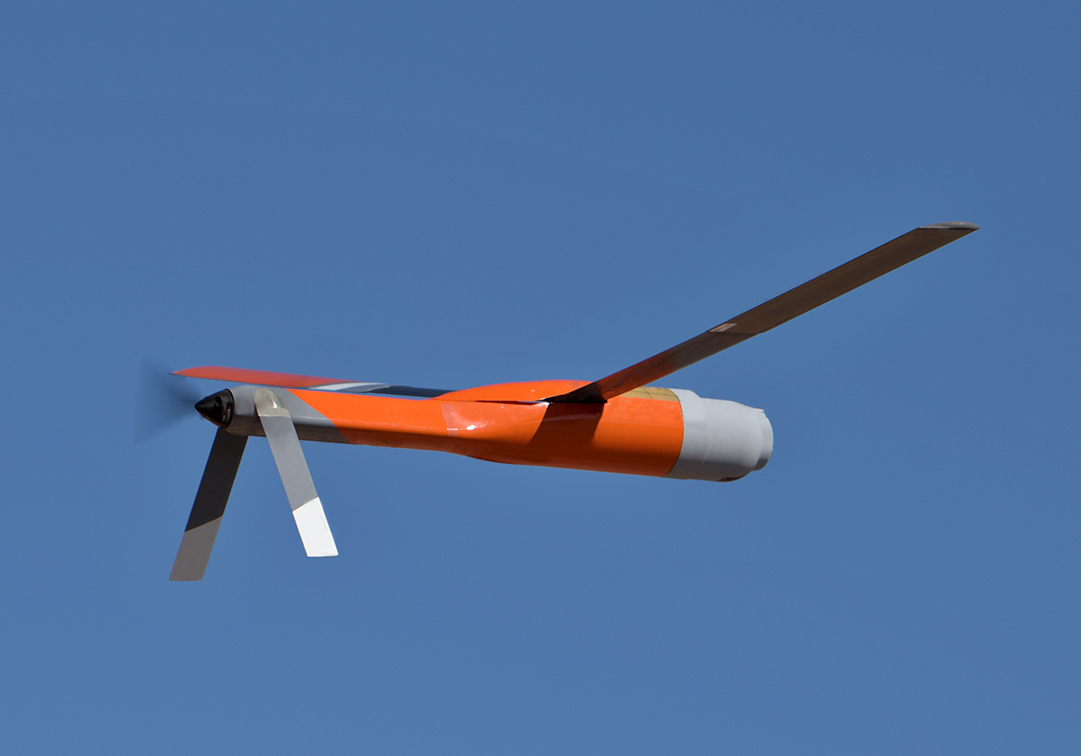
An Anduril/Area-I ALTIUS-600 Tube-Launched Unmanned Aerial System in flight

Altius (Agile Launched, Tactically-Integrated Unmanned System) is a series of fixed-wing, tube-launched unmanned aerial vehicles developed by Area-I, an Atlanta-based subsidiary of Anduril Industries acquired in April 2021. Altius 600 accepts a modular payload on the nose. It can be launched from different launchers and platforms, including C-130 aircraft, UH-60 Blackhawks, and various ground vehicles, as well as larger UAVs, including the MQ-1C Grey Eagle and Kratos XQ-58 Valkyrie stealth UCAV.

== Deployment ==
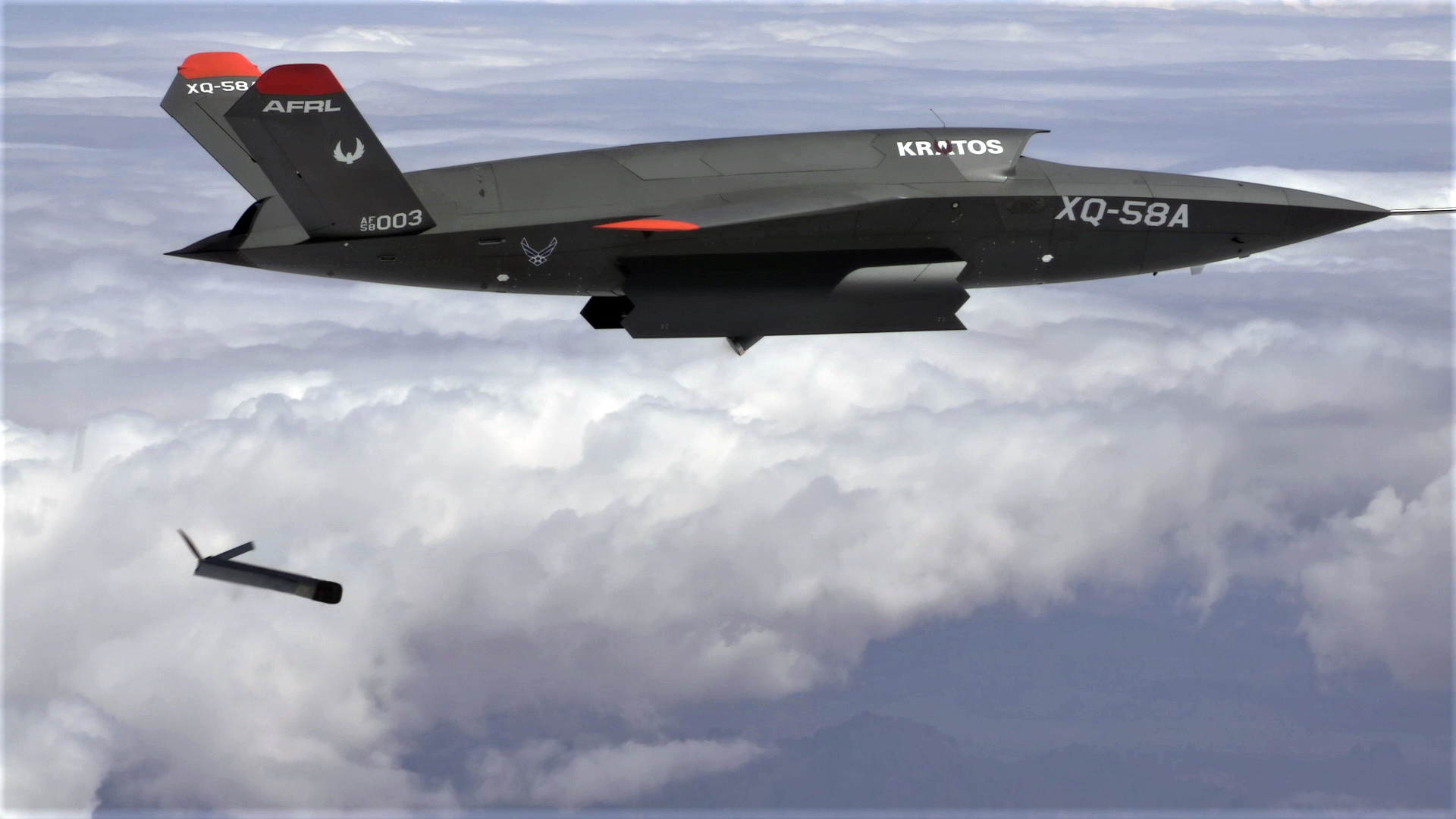
A Kratos XQ-58 Valkyrie deploys an Altius-600, 2021.

The Altius is a component of the U.S. Army's Air-Launched Effects (ALE). Swarms can operate in a mesh network. The Altius is designed to be low-cost and expendable, but can be recovered mid-flight with Flying Air Recovery System (FLARES). The loitering munition version of Altius has a range of 280 miles (450 km) and four hours flying time.

In 2022 NOAA conducts the first successful launch of the Altius-600 into a hurricane, Hurricane Ian, which records winds up to 216 miles per hour (348 km/h).

Hundreds of Altius UAVs were sent to Ukraine following the 2022 Russian invasion. According to Anduril, "they’ve proven effective against a large number of high-value enemy assets." In 2024, the Security Service of Ukraine stopped using them due to their vulnerability to Russian jamming.

The Australian Government announced in October 2026 that the Royal Australian Navy's Ghost Shark autonomous underwater vehicles could launch Anduril Altius UAVs.

== Operators ==
- Republic of China Army
- United States Army
- United States Air Force
- Ukraine
