= Miriam John =

Miriam E. John
- Other name: Mim
- Education: Rice University (BS); Tulane University (MS); Princeton University (PhD)
- Occupations: Mechanical engineer, Chemical engineer, Policy Advisor
- Employer(s): Sandia National Laboratories (1978–2006); Leidos (Board Director); Draper Laboratory (Board Director)
- Known for: Nuclear weapons systems analysis Chemical and biological defense Homeland security strategy
- Title: Vice President Emerita, Sandia National Laboratories
- Awards: National Academy of Engineering (2022); John S. Foster, Jr. Medal (2022); Eugene G. Fubini Award (2015)
- Website: www.leidos.com/company/our-team/board-of-directors/miriam-john

Miriam E. John is an American engineer who is a policy advisor and former vice president of Sandia National Laboratories. She is an expert in nuclear weapons and chemical defence. In 2022, she was awarded the Lawrence Livermore National Laboratory John S. Foster, Jr. Medal and was elected Fellow of the National Academy of Engineering.

== Early life and education ==
John earned her bachelor's degree at Rice University in 1970. She moved to Tulane University for her master's degree, and Princeton University for her doctorate. Her doctoral research considered the characterization of optically selective catalysts. She completed her Ph.D. in 1977.

== Career ==
In 1978, John joined the Sandia National Laboratory California Division, where she led the Test and Evaluation of nuclear weapons as well as Systems Analysis. She was appointed to her first management position in 1982, where she oversaw thermal and fluid analysis. W89/SRAM II, which John worked on, was the last weapon development program in the Lawrence Livermore National Laboratory before the fall of the Berlin Wall. Several of the warheads John designed were eventually produced, and eventually she was made responsible for studying and assessing nuclear weapons.

In 1999, John was made Vice President of Sandia National Laboratories, a position which she held until 2006. After retiring, John joined the advisory board of the United States Department of Defense and the Nuclear Science and Security Consortium. She has served as chair of the California Council on Science and Technology. She encouraged the Department of Defense to make use of big data and new technologies to counter nuclear proliferation.

In 2022, John was elected to the National Academy of Engineering.

== Awards and honors ==
- 2015 Eugene G. Fubini Award
- 2022 Lawrence Livermore National Laboratory John S. Foster, Jr. Medal
- 2022 Elected Fellow of the National Academy of Engineering
