= Ghost Shark (submarine) =

Autonomous underwater vehicle

Class overview
- Builders: Anduril Industries and Defence Science and Technology Group
- Operators: Royal Australian Navy; United States Navy
- Built: 2022–present
- In commission: January 2026 (planned)
- Planned: 'Dozens' (undisclosed)
- Active: 4

General characteristics
- Type: Autonomous underwater vehicle
- Length: 12 m (est.)
- Draught: 2 m (est.)
- Armament: Up to 12 naval mines; Anduril Altius aerial drones
- Notes: Information on the design has not been publicly released.

The Ghost Shark (also known as Ghost Shark XL-AUV) is a long-range, extra-large autonomous underwater vehicle being jointly developed by Anduril Industries and the Australian Department of Defence (DoD) for the Royal Australian Navy (RAN). Three prototypes were ordered for the Royal Australian Navy and one for the United States Navy. The first of the submarines was publicly revealed in April 2024, and full-rate production for the RAN was announced in September 2025.

== Project history ==
Anduril Industries signed a contract with the Royal Australian Navy and the Defence Science and Technology Group (DSTG) in May 2022. Under this contract the company was required to produce three prototype autonomous submarines over three years. It was intended for a design to be ready for manufacturing by mid-2025. The submarines were named 'Ghost Shark' in December 2022. The project forms part of initiatives to modernise the RAN, complements crewed platforms, and will be sovereign Australian technology built in Australia. A number of other projects are also being undertaken to develop autonomous and uncrewed systems for the Australian Defence Force.

The first prototype Ghost Shark, which is designated 'Alpha', was publicly revealed in Sydney in April 2024. At this time, Anduril Australia and Defence stated that the project was running on budget and ahead of schedule. During the unveiling event, Anduril's senior vice president of engineering stated that trials of the type had been underway "for some time", though he was unable to disclose for how long.

The Australian Defence Magazine has reported that the ADV Guidance auxiliary ship was likely acquired, in part, to support Ghost Shark trials.

In mid-2024, a Ghost Shark was flown to Hawaii on board a RAAF Boeing C-17 Globemaster transport aircraft during Exercise RIMPAC, to be used for trials in the United States. In August 2024, the Australian Government and Anduril reached an agreement to co-fund initial preparations for Ghost Sharks to be produced in large numbers in Australia.

On 20 August 2025, the Minister for Defence Industry, Pat Conroy, announced the Australian DoD is currently engaged in negotiating full rate production of the Ghost Shark XL-AUV. The fast-tracked decision to expand the program from a Systems Design & Development (SDD) stage directly to production was revealed after the contract to build three prototypes was delivered a year earlier than scheduled, and more than satisfied with the capability demonstrated, Government has the confidence to enter into full rate production by the end of 2025.

On 10 September 2025, the Minister for Defence, Richard Marles, announced that Australia was acquiring a fleet of 'dozens' of Ghost Shark XL-AUVs in a A$1.7 billion investment, entering service from early 2026.

More than 40 Australian companies are working as part of the Ghost Shark supply chain, and Anduril has invested $60 million in a robotic XL-AUV manufacturing facility in Australia, producing entirely sovereign autonomous maritime platforms.

== Design ==
Unlike conventional crewed submarines, the Ghost Shark XL-AUV will not have a conventional pressure hull, but will instead incorporate a 'flooded' design inside the hull spaces, with waterproof zones for key propulsion and navigation systems and payloads. This improves range and endurance, due to power supply and propulsion advantages, and allows the AUV to operate at extreme depths. The vehicle has a modular, multi-purpose capability that can adapt to mission requirements, and is designed to support subsea maritime missions globally.

Anduril leveraged technology developed for the company's Dive-LD AUV, with the Ghost Shark's capability built upon an advanced AI / machine learning software framework known as Lattice, which controls the submersible's propulsion and navigation as well as its mission decision-making.

While no specifications have been released, the prototype revealed at Fleet Base East, Sydney Harbour was more than two metres high and much longer than its predecessor, the Anduril Dive-LD at 5.8 metres long.

== Role and characteristics ==
The Department of Defence has stated that the Ghost Shark will provide a "stealthy, long-range autonomous undersea warfare capability that can conduct persistent intelligence, surveillance, reconnaissance and strike, and enhance Navy’s ability to operate with allies and partners".

Details of the submarine's characteristics and intended missions have not been publicly released as of April 2024, however AUVs are expected to augment Navy's submarine fleet by relieving crewed boats of resource-hungry, clandestine, submerged ISR and SIGINT missions, as well as potential deployment of seabed sentries and some offensive missions such as covert sea mine laying.

Chief of Navy Vice Admiral Mark Hammond has stated that Ghost Shark can be launched from onshore as well as from warships.

The government announced in October 2026 that the Ghost Sharks would be armed. Each of the submarines is capable of carrying up to 12 naval mines. They can also launch Anduril Altius aerial drones, which are equipped with small explosive warheads. Another of the Ghost Sharks capabilities is carrying supplies for special forces teams.

== See also ==
- Future of the Royal Australian Navy
- Royal Australian Navy Submarine Force
- Speartooth LUUV
- Boeing MQ-28 Ghost Bat
- Orca (AUV)
- Vityaz-D AUV
- Bluebottle
