= Eugene Fubini =

Eugene G. Fubini
- Born: Eugene Ghiron Fubini; April 19, 1913; Turin, Italy
- Died: August 5, 1997 (aged 84); Brookline, Massachusetts, U.S.
- Education: Polytechnic University of Turin (BS); University of Rome (MS, PhD)

Eugene Ghiron Fubini (April 19, 1913 – August 5, 1997) was an Italian-American physicist, academic, and scholar who participated in research that led to the creation of the first atomic bomb and also served as United States Assistant Secretary of Defense in the Kennedy and Johnson Administrations. He is known as a defense policy-maker of the Cold War and was the principal manager of the Pentagon's research and development programs.

He later served as group Vice president and chief scientist at International Business Machines Corporation from 1965 to 1969.

== Early life and education ==
Eugene was born in Turin, Italy to Guido Fubini, known for Fubini's theorem and the Fubini–Study metric. He graduated from the Technical Institute of Turin and earned a doctorate in physics at the University of Turin, where he studied under Nobel laureate Enrico Fermi. Eugene later immigrated from Italy to the United States.

== Career ==
During World War II Fubini joined the American war effort, despite his native nationality. In 1961, he joined the Office of Defense Research and Engineering at the Pentagon and rose to be Deputy Director of Defense Research and Engineering for Research and Information Systems. In June 1963, President John F. Kennedy selected him for the additional position of United States Assistant Secretary of Defense, with responsibilities encompassing military research and development programs. In this role, Fubini was a voice for the policy of technological supremacy during the Cold War. He also served as the chairman of the U.S. Communications Security Board.

== Honors, awards and memory ==
The Defense Science Board presents the Eugene G. Fubini Award on an annual basis for distinguished service. The award was established in 1996 by then Secretary of Defense, William Perry. This award is to recognize an individual who has made highly significant contributions to the Department of Defense in an advisory capacity over a sustained period of time. The first recipient was Dr. Eugene G. Fubini.

== Personal life and family ==
Eugene was married to Betty Machmer and had six children. They have five daughters and a son David Fubini.
