= David Fubini =

David G. Fubini
- Education: University of Massachusetts Amherst; Harvard Business School
- Occupation: Professor

David G. Fubini currently serves as a Senior lecturer and Henry B. Arthur Fellow at Harvard Business School. He is also co-leader of the Leading Professional Services Firm Program for Harvard Business School's Executive Education. He currently teaches 6 core courses in the Harvard MBA program and also teaches elective curriculum.

He also currently serves as a Board of Director in Bain Capital Specialty Finance, a Trustee of the University of Massachusetts, a Trustee of the Mitre Corporation, a member of the University of Massachusetts Amherst Foundation and Isenberg School of Management Dean's Committee.

He formerly served as Managing Director at McKinsey & Company, Inc. in Boston, was a member of Harvard Business School's Dean's Advisory Council (2008 to 2014) and was an Executive Committee Member at the Greater Boston Chamber of Commerce.

== Early life and education ==
David Fubini was born to Eugene Fubini who served as United States Assistant Secretary of Defense and later as group Vice president and chief scientist at International Business Machines Corporation.

David graduated summa cum laude in Spring 1976 with a Bachelor of Business Administration in marketing from Isenberg School of Management at the University of Massachusetts Amherst. He later graduated with an MBA with distinction from Harvard Business School.

== Career ==
Fubini served 33-years at McKinsey. He served as managing director of the Boston office and leader of the firm's North American Organization Practice. He was also the founder and leader of McKinsey's Worldwide Merger Integration Practice.

During his time at McKinsey Fubini participated in a broad cross section of McKinsey's leadership forums and committees. He chaired and/or served on a variety of the company's human resources committees. His work for McKinsey's clients has been largely focused on helping them to develop and execute key transformation programs, which accompany major acquisitions and mergers. Before joining McKinsey, Fubini was initially part of a small group that became the McNeil Consumer Products Company of Johnson and Johnson and helped to introduce the products of the Tylenol family to the over-the-counter consumer market.

Fubini now teaches at Harvard Business School where he is Senior Lecturer in the Organizational Behavior Unit. He has created a new elective course entitled „Leadership Execution and Action Planning“. Fubini’s MBA teaching has focused on teaching the mandatory courses Organizational Behavior, Marketing Leadership and Corporate Accountability and Ethics. He is also co-head of the leading Professional Services Firm and the Mergers and Acquisitions Program for Executive Education at Harvard Business School.

In March 2017 Fubini joined the Board of Directors of Huber. He also serves on the Board of Directors for Leidos, Mitre and Bain Credit Corporations.

== Books, Research Papers and Journals ==
David Fubini is a published author and coauthor of several books, research papers and journals.

- Let Me Explain: Eugene G. Fubini's Life in Defense of America (Publisher: Sunstone Press, Publication Year: 2015; ISBN 9781632930729).
- Mergers: Leadership, Performance and Corporate Health (Publisher: Palgrave Macmillan, Publication Year: 2006; ISBN 9780230019720).
- Hidden Truths: What Leaders Need to Hear But Are Rarely Told (Publisher: Wiley, Publication Year: 2020; ISBN 9781119682332).
