= Anduril Dive-LD =

American autonomous undersea vehicle

Dive-LD
- Type: Large displacement unmanned underwater vehicle (LDUUV)
- Place of origin: United States

Service history
- In service: 2024–present
- Used by: United States Navy
- Wars: 2026 Iran war

Production history
- Designer: Anduril Industries
- Manufacturer: Anduril Industries
- Unit cost: c. US$2.5 million (2024)
- Produced: 2024–present
- Variants: Dive-XL

Specifications
- Mass: 3 tons
- Diameter: Large-diameter
- Crew: Uncrewed (autonomous)

The Dive-LD is an American large-diameter autonomous underwater vehicle (AUV) developed and manufactured by Anduril Industries for military and commercial maritime missions. Weighing about three tons, it is designed for missions of up to 10 days' endurance, with an architecture that Anduril says can scale to multi-week missions, and can operate at depths of up to 6,000 metres. The vehicle features a modular, software-first design that allows it to be rapidly reconfigured with different payloads for missions including undersea battlespace intelligence, surveillance and reconnaissance, mine countermeasures, anti-submarine warfare, and seafloor mapping.

== Role in the 2026 Iran war ==
During the 2026 Iran war, the United States Navy deployed Dive-LD vehicles as part of a covert, months-long mine-clearing operation in the Strait of Hormuz, in which Navy divers, SEALs and underwater drones searched the seabed for explosives that Iran said it had planted after the war began in February 2026. US officials confirmed in late August 2026 that underwater drones had identified more than 100 suspected mines in the strait's traffic separation scheme over the preceding months, which private contractors then dealt with.

On 8 September 2026, Islamic Revolutionary Guard Corps Navy said it had captured an American unmanned undersea vehicle near the entrance to the Strait of Hormuz in what it described as a "complex intelligence and operational" mission, with Iranian state media identifying the captured vehicle as an Anduril Dive-LD. The IRGC said the vehicle was "one of the most modern, unmanned, and smart submarines" in US service, delivered to the fleet in 2025, and that it was equipped for subsurface reconnaissance, seabed mapping, mine detection and inspection of undersea cables and pipelines.

On 8 September 2026, U.S. Central Command (Centcom) spokesperson Navy Capt. Tim Hawkins said that the captured underwater drone was an older, malfunctioning model that posed no security risk and "was essentially dead in the water for more than a day" before being captured. Although elaboration on the defectiveness was not given, according to the spokesperson, the UUV "neither collected sensitive data nor carried any classified sonar or radar equipment". Hawkins told DefenseScoop that U.S. operations in area waters will continue.

== Design ==
The Dive-LD has a 3D-printed exterior, which Anduril says enables fast and cost-effective customisation and improves adaptability for both military and commercial use. The vehicle is powered by Anduril's Lattice OS autonomy software. Anduril has said the platform is intended to be highly producible at scale; the company operates a manufacturing facility at Quonset Point, Rhode Island, designed to deliver hundreds of Dive-LD vehicles annually, alongside a separate Australian facility producing the larger Dive-XL variant. A single Dive-LD unit was reported to cost approximately $2.5 million as of 2024.

== Development and service ==
Anduril's family of undersea vehicles, including the Dive-LD, was selected by the Defense Innovation Unit (DIU) and the US Navy in early 2024 to prototype distributed, long-range, persistent underwater sensing and payload delivery in contested environments. The vehicle was tested during the Navy's Integrated Battle Problem 24.1 exercise in San Diego Bay in March 2024. In August 2024, sources told DefenseScoop that the Pentagon had selected the Dive-LD for the second tranche of its Replicator initiative, a Defense Department effort to rapidly mass-produce attritable autonomous systems across multiple domains to help deter China. The Navy's programme office for advanced undersea systems, PMS 394, put the system forward for the initiative. Sailors assigned to Unmanned Undersea Vehicle Group 1 and Undersea Vehicle Squadron 3 conducted hands-on training with the Dive-LD in Keyport, Washington, in December 2024. Anduril subsequently announced the delivery of its first Dive-LD to the Navy's Unmanned Undersea Vehicle Squadron 1 (UUVRON-1).

== Variants ==
Anduril's undersea product line built around the Dive-LD architecture includes the Dive-XL, an extra-large AUV adapting the same modular, software-first design for longer-range and higher-payload missions at a lower relative cost, and produced in Sydney, Australia. Related Anduril maritime systems include Copperhead, a family of high-speed AUVs designed for time-sensitive missions and equipped with the Copperhead-M torpedo, and Seabed Sentry, a seabed detection system.

== See also ==
- 2026 Strait of Hormuz campaign
