= Marisa Franco =

Latino rights advocate and community organizer

Marisa Franco is a Latino rights advocate and community organizer. Her activities have centered around Arizona, where she was born, as well as New York and California.

Franco is the co-founder and director of Mijente, an online organizing tool for Latinx and Chicanx activists. Franco led the #Not1MoreDeportation campaign which was recognized in 2014 by the National Organizing Institute as Campaign of the Year. Franco is the Campaign Director at the National Day Laborer Organizing Network (NDLON) where she actively fought against SB1070 which allowed police to ask anyone in Arizona for their immigration paperwork at routine traffic stops.

She was selected as one of The Advocate's 40 under 40 in 2016. She was an organizer with the People Organized to Win Employment Rights (POWER) in San Francisco, California and worked on the campaign to enact the New York Domestic Worker's Bill of Rights.

== Mijente ==
Mijente is a family of organizations including:

- Mijente (501c4) - "Mijente". Internal Revenue Service filings. ProPublica Nonprofit Explorer.
- Mijente Support Committee (501c3) - "Mijente Support Committee". Internal Revenue Service filings. ProPublica Nonprofit Explorer.
- Mijente PAC (political action committee) - Mijente PAC at OpenSecrets

Mijente has run multiple campaigns including NoTechForICE

== Publications ==
Franco co-authored the books Towards Land, Work and Power and How We Make Change is Changing.

- "The Deportation Machine Obama Built for President Trump"
- "The Department of Homeland Security: the largest police force nobody monitors"
- "Opinion: Obama, Immigration And The Lincoln Playbook"
- "Latino communities must see Ferguson's fight as their own"
