= Defense Innovation Board =

American government advisory board

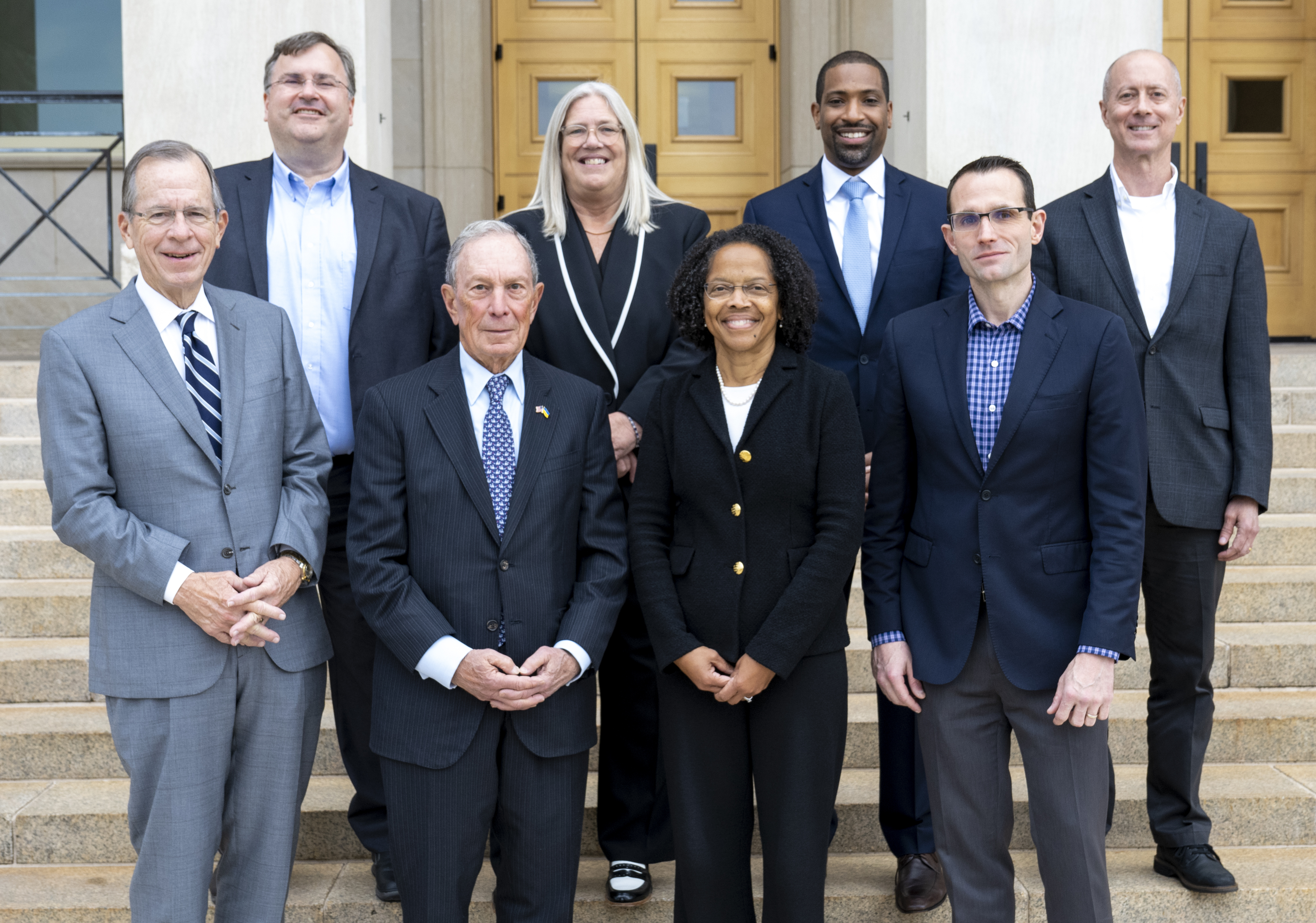
The 2022 Defense Innovation Board

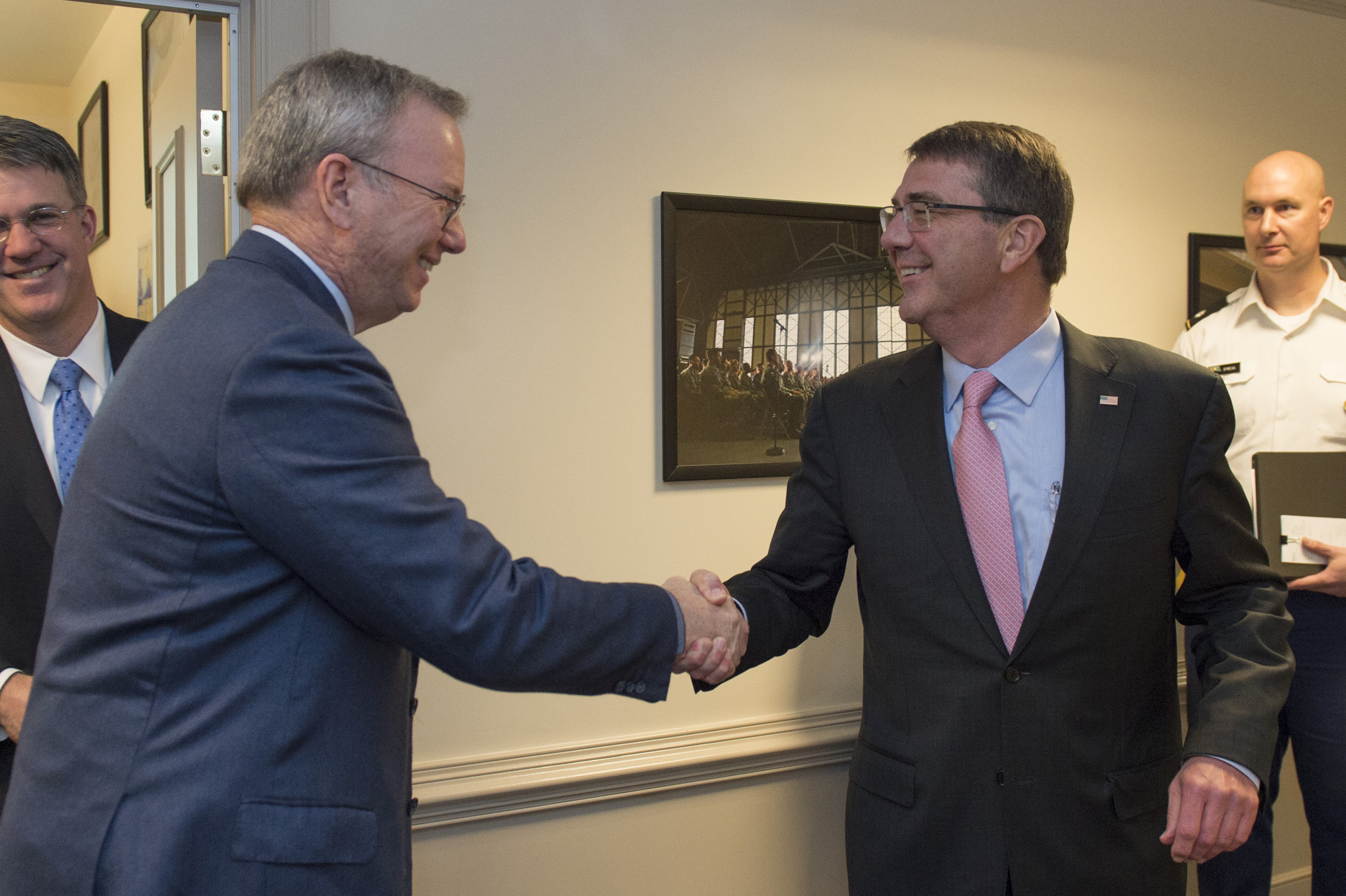
Eric Schmidt and Defense Secretary Ash Carter meet

The Defense Innovation Board was an advisory board created in 2016 to provide "independent recommendations to the United States Secretary of Defense and other senior DoD leaders on emerging technologies and innovative approaches that DoD should adopt to ensure U.S. technological and military dominance". The board's members included experts from private companies, research institutions, and academia. In 2026, it was merged with the Defense Science Board to create the Science, Technology, and Innovation Board.

The board was governed by the Federal Advisory Committee Act. Its goals were described as bringing the technological innovation and best practices of Silicon Valley, including in technology, workforce, and organizational structure, to the Department of Defense. The Board had three subcommittees: Science & Technology; Workforce, Behavior, and Culture; and Space Advisory Committee. Its areas of interest included AI, software, data, digital modernization, and human capital.

The Board's Designated Federal Officer set meetings in consultation with the Chair and DoD Chief Management Officer (DoD CMO). Meetings were usually open to the public.

In 2016, the board's members traveled throughout the world seeking innovative ideas from troops to improve processes in all theaters of operation.

== Board members ==
Joshua Marcuse served as the board's first executive director until March 2020. The board's first chairman, Eric Schmidt, served until September 2020.

As of October 2022:

- Michael Bloomberg - Chair
- Susan M. Gordon
- Reid Hoffman
- Gilda Barabino
- Michael Mullen
- Ryan Swann
- Mac Thornberry
- Will Roper

== See also ==
- DIUx
- MD5 National Security Technology Accelerator
