= Defense Science Board =

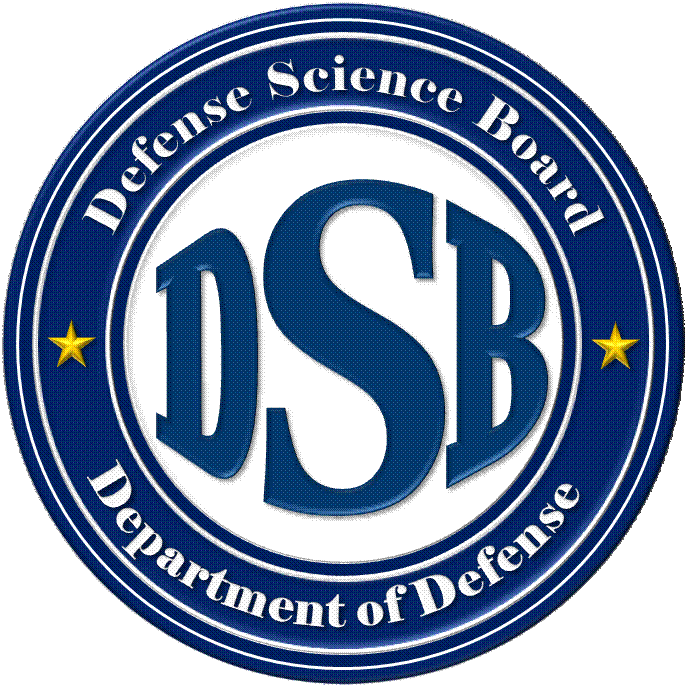

The Defense Science Board (DSB) was a committee of civilian experts appointed to advise the U.S. Department of Defense on scientific and technical matters. Established in 1956 on the second Hoover Commission's recommendation, it was merged with the Defense Innovation Board in 2026 to create the Science, Technology, and Innovation Board.

== Charter ==
The Board's charter said:

The Board shall provide the Secretary of Defense, the Deputy Secretary of Defense, the Under Secretary of Defense for Acquisition, Technology and Logistics, the Chairman of the Joint Chiefs of Staff and, as requested, other Office of the Secretary of Defense (OSD) Principal Staff Assistants, the Secretaries of the Military Departments, the Commanders of the Combatant Commands, independent advice and recommendations on scientific, technical, manufacturing, acquisition process, and other matters of special interest to the Department of Defense. The Board is not established to advise on individual DoD procurements, but instead shall be concerned with the pressing and complex technology problems facing the Department of Defense in such areas as research, engineering, and manufacturing, and will ensure the identification of new technologies and new applications of technology in those areas to strengthen national security. No matter shall be assigned to the Board for its consideration that would require any Board Member to participate personally and substantially in the conduct of any specific procurement or place him or her in the position of acting as a "procurement officials," as that term is defined pursuant to law. The Under Secretary of Defense for Acquisition, Technology and Logistics or designated representative shall be authorized to act upon the advice and recommendations of the Board.

The DSB conducted multiple simultaneous studies each year on topics selected from requests made by the Department of Defense or Congressional leaders. One or more were "summer studies" held in August, when the panels met as a group, usually in Irvine, California. Senior DoD personnel often joined the final day of a stufy to be briefed on its findings. All DSB studies produced a written report, many of which were released to the public.

Study topics were mostly listed on the DSB web page.

== Membership and designation ==
The DSB was composed of not more than 45 members and not more than 12 senior fellow members who were eminent authorities in the fields of science, technology, manufacturing, acquisition, and other matters of particular interest to the DOD. They were appointed to one- to four-year terms by the defense secretary, who could renew their appointments annually. Members who were not full-time federal officers or employees were appointed as experts and consultants under the authority of 5 U.S.C. Sec. 3109, and served as special government employees. Appointments were normally staggered among the board membership to ensure an orderly turnover in the board's overall composition. Except for travel and per diem for official travel, they normally served without compensation, unless otherwise authorized by the appointing authority. The chair was appointed by the defense secretary based upon the recommendation of the defense undersecretary for acquisition, technology and logistics, who appointed the vice chairperson. The chair and vice chair served two-year terms and longer with the secretary's approval. The secretary could invite other distinguished U.S. government officers to serve as non-voting observers, and the undersecretary could invite chairpersons from other DoD-supported federal advisory committees to serve as non-voting observers. The undersecretary could appoint experts and consultants with unique expertise to help the board on an ad hoc basis. These experts and consultants, appointed under the authority of 5 U.S.C. Sec. 3109, served as special government employees but had no voting rights on the board. Non-voting observers and those non-voting experts and consultants appointed by the undersecretary did not count toward the Board's total membership.

== History ==
The Defense Science Board was established in 1956 in response to recommendations of the Hoover Commission:

The Assistant Secretary of Defense (Research and Development) will appoint a standing committee, reporting directly to him, of outstanding basic and applied scientists. This committee will canvass periodically the needs and opportunities presented by new scientific knowledge for radically new weapons systems.

The original membership of the Board, totaling twenty-five, consisted of the chairman of the eleven technical advisory panels in the Office of the Assistant Secretary of Defense (Research and Development), the chairs of the senior advisory committees of the Army, Navy, and Air Force, the Directors of the National Science Foundation, the National Bureau of Standards, and the National Advisory Committee for Aeronautics (predecessor of the National Aeronautics and Space Administration), the President of the National Academy of Sciences, and seven members-at-large drawn from the scientific and technical community.

The Board met for the first time on September 20, 1956. Its initial assignment concerned the program and administration of basic research, component research, and the advancement of technology in areas of interest to the Department of Defense.

On December 31, 1956, a charter was issued specifying the Board as an advisory to the Assistant Secretary of Defense (Research and Development). Following the consolidation of the Assistant Secretaries of Defense for R&D and Applications Engineering offices in 1957, the Board reconstituted as advisory to the Secretary of Defense through the Assistant Secretary of Defense (Research and Engineering). Its membership was increased to 28, including ex officio members: the President's Science Advisory Committee Chairs and the Scientific Advisory Committee in the Office of Guided Missiles, Office of the Secretary of Defense (OSD). A revised Board charter was issued on October 30, 1957.

After the Department of Defense Reorganization Act of 1958, which stipulated the responsibilities, functions, and authority of the Director of Defense Research and Engineering (DDR&E), the Board's charter was revised on November 23, 1959. This revision harmonized the role and mission of the Defense Science Board with DDR&D's responsibilities, prescribing eight members-at-large and modifying ex officio membership to conform with the establishment or dissolution of advisory panels in the office of the DDR&E.

While organizing his staff, the DDR&E appointed Assistant Directors for several warfare systems. Following this action in late 1959, the Board studied the structure of scientific and engineering advisory bodies. Its report on this study was implemented by DoD Directive 5129.22, "Defense Science Board Charter," dated April 10, 1961. This directive was revised and reissued on February 17, 1971. In 1978, the title Director of Defense Research and Engineering was changed to Under Secretary of Defense for Research and Engineering (USDRE). On July 1, 1986, the Undersecretary of Defense for Research and Engineering title was changed to Under Secretary of Defense for Acquisition (USD/A). On January 1, 1990, the Defense Manufacturing Board, which had reported directly to the USD(A), merged into the Defense Science Board, adding manufacturing issues to the list of items of interest.

At the time of its merger, the board's authorized strength was 32 members plus seven ex officio members (the chairs of the Army, Navy, Air Force, Policy, Defense Business Board, and Defense Intelligence Agency advisory committees). They were selected based on their preeminence in science and technology and their application to military operations, research, engineering, manufacturing, and acquisition processes.

The board operated by forming task forces consisting of board members and other consultants/experts to address those tasks referred to by formal direction. The products of each task force typically consisted of a set of formal briefings to the board and appropriate DoD officials and a written report containing findings, recommendations, and a suggested implementation plan. The board reported directly to the Secretary of Defense through the undersecretary while working with the DDR&E to develop and strengthen the department's research and development strategies.

In 1996, the Eugene G. Fubini Award was established to recognize "Outstanding Service to the Defense Community in an Advisory Capacity".

== Chairmen ==
Name	Tenure
Howard P. Robertson	1956 – 1961
Clifford C. Furnas	1962 – 1963
Frederick Seitz	1964 – 1968
Robert L. Sproull	1969 – 1970
Gerald F. Tape	1971 – 1973
Solomon J. Buchsbaum	1974 – 1977
Eugene Fubini	1978 – 1980
Norman R. Augustine	1981 – 1983
Charles A. "Bert" Fowler	1984 – 1987
Robert R. Everett	1988 – 1989
John S. Foster Jr.	1990 – 1993
Paul G. Kaminski	1993 – 1994
Craig I. Fields	1994 – 2001
William Schneider, Jr.	2001 – 2009
Paul G. Kaminski	2009 – 2014
Craig I. Fields	2014 – 2022
Dr. Eric D. Evans	2022 – present

== Eugene G. Fubini Award recipients ==
For outstanding contributions to the Department of Defense in an advisory capacity

Year	Recipient
1996	Eugene G. Fubini
1997	No award presented
1998	Dr. John S. Foster, Jr.
1999	Dr. Joseph Braddock
2000	Norman R. Augustine
2001	Charles A. (Bert) Fowler
2002	David R. Heebner
2003	Gen. Larry D. Welch, USAF (Ret.)
2004	Dr. Robert J. Hermann
2005	Dr. Craig I. Fields
2006	Dr. James Burnett
2007	Dr. Theodore Gold
2008	Robert R. Everett
2009	Dr. James R. Schlesinger
2010	Daniel J. Fink
2011	No award presented
2012	Dr Richard Wagner
2013	Larry Lynn
2014	Robert Stein
2015	Dr. Miriam John
2016	Vincent Vitto

== See also ==
- Civilian control of the military
