= List of Organisation of Islamic Cooperation organisations =

The Organisation of Islamic Cooperation, the second largest intergovernmental organisation after the United Nations has maintained various organisations and institutions focused on various subjects, including education, social and political. Its organs include subsidiaries, specialised and affiliated institutions, Islamic universities, commercial and non-commercial agencies, and various standing committees that play significant roles within the framework of the OIC.

The OIC has also maintained independent commissions in collaboration with the 57 member states. The OIC Council of Foreign Ministers is the second-highest decision-making body while the Islamic Summit of the Organisation of Islamic Cooperation is the highest decision-making authority. Both are administered by the Secretary General of the Organisation of Islamic Cooperation who is responsible for the implementation of decisions and recommendations made by the member states.

== Subsidiary organisations ==
The organisations created under the framework of the OIC by the decision-making and policymaking bodies are known as "subsidiary" organisations. All members states became a part of subsidiary by default. However, budget is approved by OIC Council of Foreign Ministers. OIC manages six subsidiaries since its establishment.

No.	Acronyms	Agency	Headquarters	Established	Comment
1	SESRIC	Statistical, Economic and Social Research and Training Centre for Islamic Countries	(Turkey) Ankara	1978	
2	IRCICA	Research Centre for Islamic History, Art and Culture	(Turkey) Istanbul	1979	
3	IUT	Islamic University of Technology	(Bangladesh) Dhaka	1978	
4	ICDT	Islamic Centre for Development of Trade	(Morocco) Casablanca	1984	
5	IIFA	International Islamic Fiqh Academy	(Saudi Arabia) Jeddah	1981	
6	ISF	Islamic Solidarity Fund and its Waqf	(Saudi Arabia) Jeddah	1974	

== Specialised organisations ==
A specialised institution or organisation takes activities within the scope of the OIC. The council of foreign ministers are responsible for decisions, however they are implemented by the secretary general likewise subsidiary organs. When a specialised institution is adopted by the OIC, all member states required to sign memorandum than to be part of the institution automatically likewise subsidiary. Any member state has an option to become part of a specialised institution. It manages budge independently. OIC has been maintaining eight specialised institutions since it came into existence.

No.	Acronyms	Agency	Headquarters	Established	Comment
1	IDB	Islamic Development Bank	(Saudi Arabia) Jeddah	1975	
2	ICESCO	Islamic World Educational, Scientific and Cultural Organization	(Morocco) Rabat	1979	
3	IBU	Islamic Broadcasting Union	(Morocco) Rabat	1979	
4	UNA	Union of OIC News Agencies	(Saudi Arabia) Jeddah	1972	
5	ICIC	Islamic Committee of the International Crescent	(Libya) Benghazi	1977	
6	STIO	The Science, Technology and Innovation Organization	(Pakistan) Islamabad	2010	
7	IOFS	Islamic Organisation for Food Security	(Kazakhstan) Astana	2013	
8	WDO	Women Development Organization	(Egypt) Cairo	2009	

== Affiliated organisations ==
Affiliated institutions membership is optional and a government, non-government, company or group within the territories of member states needs to sign memorandum to become a part of the OIC. Their budget is independent than being dependent likewise the budget of the Secretariat General, subsidiary and specialized organs. An Affiliated institutions of the OIC may obtain the status of observer granted by the Council of Foreign Ministers. They may also be voluntarily assisted by the OIC'S subsidiary as well as specialized institutions. The OIC has maintained seventeen affiliated institutions within its scope.

No.	Acronyms	Agency	Headquarters	Established	Comment
1	ICCIA	Islamic Chamber of Commerce, Industry and Agriculture	(Pakistan) Karachi	1978	
2	OICC	Organization of Islamic Capitals and Cities	(Saudi Arabia) Jeddah	1980	
3	ISSF	Islamic Solidarity Sports Federation	(Saudi Arabia) Riyadh	1985	
4	WFAIIS	World Federation of Arabo-Islamic International Schools	(Egypt) Cairo	1976	
5	OISA	Organization of the Islamic Shipowners Association	Saudi Arabia	1972	
6	ICYF-DC	Islamic Conference Youth Forum for Dialogue and Cooperation	(Turkey) Istanbul	2004	
7	IUMS	International Union of Muslim Scouts	(Saudi Arabia) Jeddah	1995	
8	FCIC	Federation of Consultants from Islamic Countries	(Turkey) Istanbul	1986	
9	IAS	Islamic World Academy of Sciences	(Turkey) Istanbul	2010	
10	CIBAFI	General Council for Islamic Banks and Financial Institutions	(Bahrain) Manama	2001	
11	FOCIC	Federation of Contractors from Islamic Countries	-	-	
12	OIC-CERT	OIC Computer Emergency Response Team	(Malaysia) Mines Wellness City	2009	
13	SMIIC	Standards and Metrology Institute for Islamic Countries	(Turkey) Istanbul	1984	
14	IIUM	International Islamic University Malaysia	(Malaysia) Selangor	1983	
15	ATAIC	Association of Tax Authorities of Islamic Countries	(Sudan) Khartoum	2003	
16	REUOS	Real Estate Union in Islamic States	-	-	
17	IBRAF	Organisation of Islamic Cooperation Broadcasting Regulatory Authorities Forum	(Turkey) Istanbul	2011	

== Standing Committees ==
In OIC's charter, a standing committee is a body working in the field of critical issues concerning cultural, political, social, religious and human rights issues among others. They are principally focused on human rights mechanism challenges within the member states. OIC has created four standing committees, including one sub-standing committee, Bayt Mal Al Quds Agency.

No.	Acronyms	Agency	Headquarters	Established	Comment
1	-	Al-Quds Committee	(Morocco) Rabat	1975	
2	-	Bayt Mal Al Quds Agency	(Morocco) Rabat	1995	
3	COMIAC	Standing Committee for Information and Cultural Affairs	(Senegal) Dakar	1981	
4	COMCEC	Standing Committee for Economic and Commercial Cooperation	(Turkey) Ankara	1981	
5	COMSTECH	Standing Committee for Scientific and Technological Cooperation	(Pakistan) Islamabad	1981	

== Other organs ==
The OIC has also maintained the Independent Permanent Human Rights Commission, an independent commission that formulate policies on human rights issues in Jerusalem and Palestine. It plays a central role in the protection of Al-Aqsa, in addition to observing the Israeli–Palestinian conflict and the Kashmir conflict.

== See also ==
- Secretary General of the Organisation of Islamic Cooperation
- Parliamentary Union of the OIC Member States
- Islamic Summit of the Organisation of Islamic Cooperation
- OIC Council of Foreign Ministers
