= General Secretariat of the Organisation of Islamic Cooperation =

Executive body of the Organisation of Islamic Cooperation

General Secretariat
- General Secretariat of the Organisation of Islamic Cooperation
- Arabic: الأمانة العامة; French: Secrétariat général
- Flag of the OIC
- Formation: 1970; 56 years ago
- Founded at: Jeddah, Saudi Arabia
- Type: Executive body
- Legal status: Foundation
- Purpose: Management of the OIC
- Location: Jeddah, Saudi Arabia
- Members: 57 member states
- Official language: Arabic, English, French
- Head: Secretary General of the Organisation of Islamic Cooperation; Hissein Brahim Taha (2020–present)
- Main organ: Organisation of Islamic Cooperation
- Website: oic-oci.org

General Secretariat of the Organisation of Islamic Cooperation, commonly known as General Secretariat (Arabic: الأمانة العامة; French: Secrétariat général), is an executive body and primary organ of the Organisation of Islamic Cooperation that consists of the secretary general and staff members of the OIC, the second-largest intergovernmental organization after the United Nations. General Secretariat is tasked with decision implementation, in addition to maintaining the entire organisation, including its charter. It also maintains Standing Committees, an Executive Committee and the Independent Permanent Human Rights Commission across the 57 member states. It manages subsidiaries, specialized, and affiliated institutions of the OIC, with prime focus on OIC Council of Foreign Ministers and Islamic summit conducted by the 57 member states.

Headquartered in Jeddah, Saudi Arabia, it is the main executive body concerning the protection, promotion and development of the OIC. In addition to coordinating programmes, it also makes recommendations for summits and conferences in the area of common interest of the organisation. It manages all departments of the organisation which are headed by one or more assistant secretaries general of the concerned departments.

== History ==
General Secretariat was established in 1970 by the council of foreign affairs minister in the 1st summit held in Jeddah, Saudi Arabia, in Muharram 1390H, corresponding to February 1970. The office term was decided by the 3rd summit of foreign ministers held in Mecca, Saudi Arabia, in 1981. The third summit decided on a term of 2 years; however, it was later extended to four years by the 12th summit. It is temporarily headquartered in Jeddah until Jerusalem is supposed to be liberated which is scheduled to become the official workplace of the Secretariat. General Secretariat has been created under the organization's Chapter XI.

General Secretariat is also entitled with the management of council of foreign ministers' and subsidiaries budget under Chapter V of the OIC Charter. Chapter VII regulates its meetings, summits, conferences, and headquarters.
