= Charter of the Organisation of Islamic Cooperation =

1969 foundational treaty of the Organisation of Islamic Cooperation

- Flag of the OIC
- Signed: 25 August 1969; 56 years ago
- Location: Rabat, Morocco
- Effective: 4 March 1972
- Signatories: Islamic Summit of the Organisation of Islamic Cooperation, OIC Council of Foreign Ministers
- Parties: 57
- Depositary: Intergovernmental
- Citations: OIC charter chapter I—XVIII
- Languages: Arabic, English, French

The Charter of the Organisation of Islamic Cooperation, commonly known as OIC Charter, is the foundational treaty of the Organisation of Islamic Cooperation. Its foundational principles are based on 18 chapters that objectively maintains the purpose, focus, functions, and foundation of the OIC, an intergovernmental organization founded in 1969. The charter was formally signed on 25 September 1969 by the 57 member states, including 5 observer states. However, it was revised by the 11th summit held in Dakar, Senegal, on 14 March 2008.

OIC charter determines the role of organisations, institutions and organs, including six subsidiaries, eight specialized institutions, seventeen affiliated organizations, four standing committees, General Secretariat, one independent commission, and the Parliamentary Union of the OIC Member States, including the OIC Council of Foreign Ministers and Islamic summit. It outlines guidelines, principles, policies and procedures of the entire OIC and its associated members and organs.

== Summary ==
The charter consists of 39 articles grouped into 18 chapters. Each chapter determine different roles and purpose of the whole OIC and its mission in the Muslim world while articles address respective chapters within the framework of the OIC.

- Chapter I consists of a detailed account of principles concerning its role in cooperation with the members states on various subjects, including fraternity and solidarity, domestic affairs of the respective sovereign states and territories and defending Islamic culture, human rights and fundamental rights in general. Chapter I determines the role of OIC in restoration of sovereignty and integrity of the concerned occupational states. It outlines global politics, economic development and social decision-making processes entrusted with safeguarding public interests. It also determines global peace, security.
- Chapter II organise 57 member and provides membership to the non-member states with Muslim majority registered with the United Nations. It also grant observer status to its associated member states.
- Chapter III determine the status of main bodies and it consists of major branches of the OIC, including Islamic summit, OIC Council of Foreign Ministers, standing committees, subsidiary organs, specialized institutions, affiliated institutions, executive committee, International Islamic Court of Justice, the Independent Permanent Human Rights Commission, Committee of Permanent Representatives, and General Secretariat
- Chapter IV formulates the composition of Islamic Summit of the Organisation of Islamic Cooperation and determines that summit shall be attended by the heads of state, kings, government of member states and the supreme authority of the OIC. Summit shall make independent decision on policymaking and formulation.
- Chapter V maintainers the OIC Council of Foreign Ministers, including its summit and extraordinary sessions. It grants permission to the Secretary General of the Organisation of Islamic Cooperation to implement the decisions.
- Chapter VI maintains various institutions to discuss critical issues on various subjects. It determines the status of Al-Quds Committee, Standing Committee for Information and Cultural Affairs (COMIAC), Standing Committee for Economic and Commercial Cooperation (COMCEC), and the Standing Committee for Scientific and Technological Cooperation (COMSTECH). Standing Committees, according to the chapter VI shall be attended by kings and heads of state and the government of the member states.
- Chapter VII maintains Executive Committee which consists minister of foreign affairs.
- Chapter VIII sets rules for the meeting attended by the Committee of Permanent Representatives
- Chapter IX grants the status of judicial organ to the International Islamic Court of Justice
- Chapter X regulates the Independent Permanent Human Rights Commission
- Chapter XI regulates the General Secretariat and determines the role of secretary general
- Chapter XII establishes subsidiaries, specialized institutions, and approves the status of affiliated organisation.
- Chapter XIII determines the role of specialized and affiliated institutions within the framework of chapter XIII.
- Chapter XIV regulates the cooperation in the member states and the OIC
- Chapter XV maintains world peace and international security. The organisation is entitled to play its role in disputed territory in the Muslim world.
- Chapter XVI regulates budget and finance of the whole organization and its subsidiaries, specialized as well as affiliated institutions.
- Chapter XVII regulates rules of procedure and voting of the OIC Council of Foreign Ministers and Islamic summits.
- Chapter XVIII maintains a friendly environment between the OIC and member states for its objectives and functions, in addition to maintaining withdrawal of membership. Under this chapter, a member states may present a proposal for adoption of new amendments.
