= Organization of Islamic Capitals and Cities =

Affiliated organ of Organisation of Islamic Cooperation

- Arabic: منظمة العواصم والمدن الإسلامية; French: Organisation des capitales et villes islamiques
- Abbreviation: OICC
- Formation: 1980; 46 years ago
- Founded at: Dakar, Senegal
- Type: Nonprofit, NGO
- Legal status: Foundation
- Purpose: Preservation of cultural heritage, capacity building in capitats of 56 member states
- Location: Mecca, Saudi Arabia
- Members: 56 member capitals
- Official language: Arabic, English, French
- Secretary General: Omar bin Abdullah Abdul Rahim Qazi
- Main organ: Organisation of Islamic Cooperation
- Affiliations: OIC
- Website: www.oicc.org
- Formerly called: Organization of Islamic Capitals

The Organization of Islamic Capitals and Cities (OICC; Arabic: منظمة العواصم والمدن الإسلامية; French: Organisation des capitales et villes islamiques), formerly known as Organization of Islamic Capitals, is one of the affiliated organs and nonprofit organization of the Organisation of Islamic Cooperation focused on preservation and promotion of cultural heritage of the capitals and largest cities of the 56 member states. It also works for the promotion of capacity building programs by coordinating with the member states for the development of international relations among the member states.

Headquartered in Mecca, Saudi Arabia, it primarily works for the development of cities rather than whole countries. It is principally focused on urban areas and dedicated to sustainable development in the member capitals.

== History ==
The Organization of Islamic Capitals and Cities was introduced as an affiliated institution by adopting a resolution no. 9/9-P. The resolution was formally adopted by the OIC Council of Foreign Ministers in the 9th session held in Dakar, Senegal on 17 May 1998 followed by the hijiri 24 April 1978. The 10th session was held in Fez, Morocco on 8 March 1979 followed by hijri 10 June 1399 where a resolution no. 25/10-P was adopted.

It was formally established as Organization of Islamic Capitals in 1400 hijri corresponding 1980. The summit was attended by Islamic Summit of the Organisation of Islamic Cooperation in Mecca between 11 and 12, 1400 rabiʽ al-awwal followed by 29 and 30 January 1980. The organisation was ratified on the same date with amendments to appoint administrative council and secretary general. However, its original name was revised by a resolution no. 5/2-G by the 2nd season of general conference which was held in Islamabad, Pakistan between 14 and 16, 1402 jumada al-thani corresponding 8 and 10 April 1982.

== Awards established ==
The organisation also distribute annual awards such as Municipal Services Award for organisations and groups working in the respective fields.
