= OIC Broadcasting Regulatory Authorities Forum =

Affiliated organ of the Organisation of Islamic Cooperation

- Organisation of Islamic Cooperation Broadcasting Regulatory Authorities Forum
- Arabic: منتدى هيئات تنظيم البث في منظمة التعاون الإسلامي; French: Forum des autorités de régulation de la radiodiffusion de l'OCI; Turkish: İİT Yayın Düzenleyici Otoriteler Forumu
- Abbreviation: IBRAF
- Formation: 20 April 2012; 14 years ago
- Founder: Organisation of Islamic Cooperation
- Founded at: Istanbul, Turkey
- Type: Broadcasting forum
- Legal status: Foundation
- Purpose: Building cooperation among broadcasting regulatory authorities
- Location: Istanbul, Turkey
- Fields: Broadcasting
- Members: 36 member states
- Official language: Arabic, English, French, Turkish
- Main organ: Organisation of Islamic Cooperation
- Website: www.oic-ibraf.org

The OIC Broadcasting Regulatory Authorities Forum (IBRAF; Arabic: منتدى هيئات تنظيم البث في منظمة التعاون الإسلامي; French: Forum des autorités de régulation de la radiodiffusion de l'OCI; Turkish: İİT Yayın Düzenleyici Otoriteler Forumu), also referred to as Organisation of Islamic Cooperation Broadcasting Regulatory Authorities Forum or the International Broadcasting Regulatory Authorities Forum, is an intergovernmental and one of the 17 affiliated institutions of the Organisation of Islamic Cooperation focused on establishment of cooperation between the OIC and broadcasting regulatory authorities of the 36 member states out of 57. It is principally focused on conducting measures against the backdrop of digitalization and convergence.

It has maintained a platform for sharing information, ideas, views, opinions, and experience concerning common interest within the field of broadcasting. It has also been conducting discussions con audiovisual, concerning cultural relations, child protection and Islamophobia among others.

== History ==
Broadcasting Regulatory Authorities Forum was established after a session was held by the OIC Council of Foreign Ministers in Istanbul, Turkey between 17 and 18 November 2011. It was formally established in the 9th session held by Islamic Conference of Information Ministers (ICI) by adopting a resolution 11/9-INF between 17 and 20 April 2012 in Libreville, Gabon. The second resolution was adopted between 2 and 3 October 2012 in Jeddah, Saudi Arabia under the OIC Charter.

The first IBRAF executive secretary was appointed Prof. Hamit Ersoy who assumed the office on 06 February 2013. The appointment decision was made by Radio and Television Supreme Council.
