= Association of Tax Authorities of Islamic Countries =

Affiliated organ of the Organisation of Islamic Cooperation

- Association des autorités fiscales des pays islamiques (French); رابطة السلطات الضريبية للدول الإسلامية (Arabic)
- Abbreviation: ATAIC
- Formation: 15 October 2003; 23 years ago
- Founded at: Putrajaya, Malaysia
- Type: Intergovernmental organization
- Legal status: foundation
- Purpose: Islamic taxes, zakat
- Location: Khartoum, Sudan
- Fields: Economic development and administration
- Members: 30 member states
- Official language: Arabic, English, French
- Secretary General: Mohamed Ali Mustafa Sharafeldin
- Main organ: Organisation of Islamic Cooperation

The Association of Tax Authorities of Islamic Countries (ATAIC; French: Association des autorités fiscales des pays islamiques; Arabic: رابطة السلطات الضريبية للدول الإسلامية) is an intergovernmental organization and one of the 17 affiliated organs of the Organisation of Islamic Cooperation. Founded in 2003 by the eleven Islamic countries including Pakistan, it is focused on improving and maintaining Islamic taxes, including zakat policies for rapid economic development in the member states. It also serves as a forum of discussion and research institute for the matters associated with the Islamic taxation system.

Headquartered in Khartoum, Sudan, it plays a central role in administration and legislation for the promotion of tax and zakat for economic development and mutual cooperation in the member states. The ATAIC conducts annual seminars, workshops and training courses for gathering tax information needed for analysing and disseminating tax and zakat administration.

== History ==
The Association of Tax Authorities of Islamic Countries was introduced in 2003, however it became OIC's affiliated organ in December 2010 after the government of Sudan submitted a request to grant the ATAIC an affiliate organ status. The request was formally approved through a resolution no. 7/38-ORG by the OIC Council of Foreign Ministers in its 38th session held in Astana, Kazakhstan between 28 and 30 June 2011.

The organization held its first-ever conference on 4 October 2004 in Putrajaya, Malaysia, the second conference on November 29, 2005, in Tehran, Iran, while third conference was hosted by Pakistan on 22 November 22, 2006. The fourth conference was hosted by Kuwait on 25 November 2007, fifth conference by Indonesia on 26 October 2008, while the sixth and last conference was hosted by Sudan on 11 October 2009 where the organization was granted an affiliate status.

== Members ==
The ATAIC has 30 member states out of 57. Iran became a member of Executive Council of the organization in 2021.

#	Country	Agencies	References
1	Afghanistan	Afghanistan Revenue Department Electronic Service	
2	Djibouti	Ministry of Economy and Finance In Charge of Industry and Planning (MEFIP)	
3	Iran	Iranian National Tax Administration (INTA)	
4	Lebanon	Ministry of Finance	
5	Morocco	Ministry of Economy and Finance	
6	Saudi Arabia	Zakat, Tax and Customs Authority	
7	Tajikistan	—N/a	
8	United Arab Emirates	Federal Tax Authority	
9	Bangladesh	National Board of Revenue (NBR)	
10	Egypt	Egyptian Tax Authority	
11	Iraq	General Authority for Taxes	
12	Malaysia	Lembaga Hasil Dalam Negeri Malaysia	
13	Pakistan	Federal Board of Revenue	
14	Senegal	Ministry of Finance	
15	Tunisia	Ministry of Finance	
16	Yemen	Department of Tax, Yemen	
17	Brunei Darussalam	—N/a	
18	Guyana	—N/a	
19	Jordan	Income and Sales Tax Department	
20	Maldives	Maldives Inland Revenue Authority (MIRA)	2013
21	Palestine	Ministry of Finance	
22	Sierra Leone	National Revenue Authority (NRA)	
23	Turkey	Turkish Revenue Administration	
24	Comoros	—N/a	
25	Indonesia	—N/a	
26	Kuwait	Ministry of Finance	
27	Mauritania	General Directorate of Taxes (DGI)	
28	Qatar	Qatar Financial Centre (QFC)	
29	Sudan	Sudan Taxation Chamber	
30	Uganda	Uganda Revenue Authority	
