= Standards and Metrology Institute for Islamic Countries =

Affiliated organ of Organisation of Islamic Cooperation

- Arabic: معهد المواصفات والمقاييس للدول الإسلامية; French: Institut de normalisation et de métrologie pour les pays islamiques Turkish: İslam Ülkeleri Standardlar ve Metroloji Enstitüsü
- Official patch of the SMIIC
- Abbreviation: SMIIC
- Formation: 2010; 16 years ago
- Founded at: Istanbul, Turkey
- Headquarters: Istanbul Dunya Ticaret Merkezi Al Blok No: 437-438
- Location: Istanbul, Turkey
- Fields: Standardization, metrology
- Members: 37 member states, 2 observers
- Official language: Arabic, English, French, Turkish
- Secretary General: İhsan Övüt
- Board of directors: Chairperson; Saudi Arabia; Vice-chairperson: Pakistan; Sudan; Tunisia; Turkey; United Arab Emirates
- Main organ: Organisation of Islamic Cooperation
- Website: www.smiic.org/en

Standards and Metrology Institute for Islamic Countries (SMIIC; Arabic: معهد المواصفات والمقاييس للدول الإسلامية; French: Institut de normalisation et de métrologie pour les pays islamiques; Turkish: İslam Ülkeleri Standardlar ve Metroloji Enstitüsü) is an intergovernmental and one of the 17 affiliated organizations of the Organisation of Islamic Cooperation. Its primary focus is on standardization and metrology technical elements. It is principally focused on the procedures for the removal of technical barriers concerning standards covering materials, manufacturers and products. It coordinates with the 37 member states and two observers for the administrative tasks for the trade development within the framework of the OIC.

SMIIC maintains a trade and development ecosystem for economic development of the member states. It also propose ideas for the international trade, production of goods and products. SMIIC also conduct research projects on metrology, laboratory testing, in addition to providing cost-sharing mechanism and standardization across the associated countries. Entrusted with education and training for associated bodies, it uses existing terms to educational institutions.

It also share documents and information within its scope to those member states where such procedures are not conducted. To train a member state in concerned field, SMIIC provide technical assistance and data for the establishment of standardization and metrological-oriented departments.

== History ==
Standards and Metrology Institute for Islamic Countries was first proposed by the Standing Committee for Economic and Commercial Cooperation (COMCEC) in its 1st session held in 1984 and the Standardization Experts Group for Islamic Countries (SEG) was created in 1985 to fulfill the requirements of SMIIC. Following that, a new organisation, Standards and Metrology Institute for Islamic Countries (SMIIC) statute was submitted for approval in 1998 in the 14th COMCEC session hosted in Istanbul, Turkey. It was later submitted to the member states for acquiring its membership between 4 and 7 November 1999. The agency statute came into existence after ratified by the 10 member states in May 2010 and hence the OIC Council of Foreign Ministers formally signed it in August 2010.

SMIIC made changes in its documents in 2017 and two new departments, Standardization Management Council Metrology Council and Accreditation Council were created to restructure the organisation for management purposes. With restructuring, Turkey Turkish board of directors became its permanent member. The revised legislation of SMIIC was carried out in the 15 session by its executive board and 12th General Assembly which was held between 25 and 26 November 2017. The post of Standardization Management Council and Accreditation Council Management's secretary general was created between 2018 and 2020.

=== SMIIC Standardization Governance Council ===
It was established in 2017 for monitoring standard preparation in the member states. Consists of SMIIC representatives, the council is responsible for maintaining Technical Committee which was formally inaugurated in 2018.

== Organisational structure ==
SMIIC consists seven departments including administrative and academic departments and three main organs.

- General Assembly: consisting of member states, it is the highest decision-making body of the SMIIC.
- Board of Directors: is the supervisory body responsible for the execution of programs, plans and activities. It consists of 13 members based on geographical locations elected by the General Assembly.
  - Standardization Management Council: coordinates with the member states and is tasked with the development of the organisation and overall performance of the technical committees.
  - Metrology Council: conducts laboratory testing and provide references to the works of the organisation.
  - Accreditation Council: implements accreditation standards with the member states
  - Standing Advisory Committee: provides advice concerning governance, policymaking.
- General Secretariat: headed by a general secretary, it implements program plans and decisions of the organisation.
