= Al-Quds Committee =

Standing committee of the Organisation of Islamic Cooperation

- لجنة القدس (Arabic); Comité Al Qods (French)
- Formation: 12 July 1975; 51 years ago
- Founders: OIC
- Type: Intergovernmental nonprofit organization
- Legal status: Foundation
- Purpose: Run humanitarian campaign, social, cultural and political projects concerning Israeli–Palestinian conflict
- Headquarters: Ilôt 13, 2 Av. Attine, Hay Riad
- Locations: Rabat, Morocco; Ramallah, West Bank
- Members: 16 member states
- Official languages: Arabic, English, French
- Chairperson: Mohammed VI
- Board of directors: OIC Council of Foreign Ministers
- Main organ: Organisation of Islamic Cooperation
- Subsidiaries: Standing Committee for Information and Cultural Affairs (COMIAC); COMCEC; COMSTECH
- Affiliations: Bayt Mal Al Quds Agency
- Expenses: $57 million
- Website: bmaq.org

Al-Quds Committee (Arabic: لجنة القدس; French: Comité Al Qods), also known by its affiliated arm name adopted in 1995, Bayt Mal Al Quds Agency (Arabic: وكالة بيت مال القدس; French: Agence Bayt Mal Al Qods), is an intergovernmental organization and one of the four standing committees of the Organisation of Islamic Cooperation established in July 1975. It is focused on cultural, political, social, religious and human rights issues in Jerusalem caused by the Israeli–Palestinian conflict. Its principles are predominantly focused on the protection of Al-Aqsa, and cultural heritage of the city in addition to serving as an advocacy agency specialized in humanitarian and social works, concerning health, education housing children's as well as women's rights.

It runs several projects in the city of Jerusalem such as sports activities, health awareness programs, and educational scholarships, in addition to serving as a financial assistance institute for the restoration of war-affected houses. As of July 2021, it has financed about $57 million to run its projects concerning social, cultural, education, health and housing in Jerusalem and Palestine. It is also entrusted with advocating for the support of King Hassan II College of Environmental and Agricultural Sciences in Gaza.

== Administration background ==
The committee is dependently run and administrated by the OIC Council of Foreign Ministers of the 16 member states. In addition to being financed by the member states, the committee has also run protects contributed by public and private vendors, including organisations and individuals. The Kingdom of Morocco is the largest contributor of 87% funds which declined significantly since the last 3 years. The King of Morocco serves as its chairperson.

== History ==
Al-Quds Committee was established after the OIC Council of Foreign Ministers adopted a resolution No. 1/6-P between 12 and 15 July 1975. The summit was hosted in Jeddah, Saudi Arabia. The idea of Bayt Mal al-Quds Agency initiative was originally introduced by the king of Morocco, Hassan II in the 15th session held in Ifrane, Morocco in 1995. The idea came into effect between 9 and 13 December 1995 in the 23rd session held in Conakry, Guinea and hence Bayt Mal al-Quds Agency was established as an affiliate agency of Al-Quds Committee.

Bayt Mal Al Quds was formally created on 30 July 1998 after it was granted legal status by the OIC Council of Foreign Ministers. It held its first meeting on 14 February 2000 under the leadership of Morocco's king, Mohammed VI, in the presence of the Secretary-General of the Organisation of Islamic Cooperation.

Bayt Mal Al Quds Agency is administered by finance ministers of the member states. Its Trusteeship Committee consists of foreign affairs ministers of five members, including those of Morocco and Palestine. It is headquartered at Ilôt2, Av. Attine, Hay Riad, Rabat.

== Role of Morocco ==
Morocco plays a significant role in Al-Quds Committee. The committee received maximum fundraising contribution from the country. Within a span of 22 years, the Bayt Mal Al Qods Agency carried out 200 "major" projects and dozens of small and medium projects, which costed $64 million (MAD 657.5 million), have benefited all segments of the city's residents.

In March 2024, King Mohammed VI issued instructions to the Bayt Mal Al Quds Agency to provide food assistance to the city's residents. This assistance includes the distribution of two thousand food baskets benefiting two thousand Jerusalemite families, providing a thousand meals daily for the Palestinians in the city, and establishing an emergency coordination room at the Jerusalem Hospital. Additionally, he instructed to launch a humanitarian operation to deliver more than forty tons of food, including essential supplies, by land, to benefit Palestinian residents in Gaza and the holy city of Jerusalem, aiming to alleviate the suffering of Palestinian populations, especially the most vulnerable groups.

== Membership ==
OIC has a membership of 57 Muslim nations, however the Al-Quds Committee is signed by 16 countries, including Morocco, Saudi Arabia, Jordan, Iraq, Palestine, Lebanon, Mauritania, Egypt, Bangladesh, Pakistan, Iran, Indonesia, Senegal, Niger, and Guinea. The OIC suspended Syria's membership in 2012, and thus it is longer a part of the Al-Quds Committee.
