= Women Development Organization =

Specialised institution of the Organisation of Islamic Cooperation

- Arabic: منظمة تنمية المرأة; French: Organisation de développement des femmes
- Flag of the OIC
- Abbreviation: WDO
- Formation: 2009; 17 years ago
- Founder: Organisation of Islamic Cooperation
- Founded at: Cairo, Egypt
- Type: Specialized organization
- Legal status: Foundation
- Purpose: Women's empowerment
- Location: Cairo, Egypt
- Fields: Women's rights
- Members: 15 member states
- Official language: Arabic, English, French
- Deputy executive director: Ehab Fawzy
- Main organ: Organisation of Islamic Cooperation
- Affiliations: UN Women

Women Development Organization (WDO; Arabic: منظمة تنمية المرأة; French: Organisation de développement des femmes), is an intergovernmental organisation and one of the eight specialized institutions of the Organisation of Islamic Cooperation focused on conducting major steps for women's development. It plays a central role in structuring and maintaining internal regulations for women's empowerment with the 15 Islamic countries out of 57 member states. It is principally focused on four standards, including women's role in combating extremism, women in positions of power and decision-making, women's protection against violence, and women's empowerment, economic development and financial inclusion.

The organisation, along with its member states raises common issues concerning the protection and promotion of women’s rights. It also conducts programs and initiative sessions for the implementation of policies necessary for the development of women's rights, in addition to organise workshops and training-oriented programs for women's welfare. The organisation has also been conducting research within the framework of OIC'S charter.

== History ==
Headquartered in Cairo, Egypt, the resolution was formally adopted in 2010 by the OIC Council of Foreign Ministers. The first session was held in 2009 that recognised it as a specialized organization in the field of educational, economical, social, cultural and women's political development. WDO operates on different principles in different geographical locations under the specific law and regulations enforced by its respective member states.

Affiliated with the UN Women, the 8th Council of Foreign Ministers hosted by Egypt was discussed on 8 July 2021 where UN Women became a part of this organisation.

Since its establishment in 2009, the 15 Islamic countries such as Burkina Faso, Cameroon, Djibouti, Egypt, Gabon, Gambia, Guinea, Kuwait, Maldives, Mauritania, Niger, the Islamic Republic of Pakistan, the Kingdom of Saudi Arabia, Palestine and the United Arab Emirates signed memorandum to be part of the organisation.

== Role of Egypt ==
Egyptian government plays central role in the organisation. It actively collaborates with it to create a supportive environment for women's development and provides necessary proposed plans for women's empowerment. It has been organising and participating in the events held by the WDO in different areas.
