= World Federation of Arabo-Islamic International Schools =

Affiliated organ of the Organisation of Islamic Cooperation

- Arabic: الاتحاد العالمي للمدارس العربية الإسلامية الدولية; French: Fédération mondiale des écoles internationales arabo-islamiques
- Official patch of the WFAIIS

- Flag of the OIC
- Abbreviation: WFAIIS
- Formation: 26 March 1976; 50 years ago
- Founded at: Riyadh, Saudi Arabia
- Type: Affiliated organ
- Legal status: Federation
- Purpose: Islamic studies, Islamic culture
- Locations: Cairo, Egypt; Madinah, Saudi Arabia; Peshawar, Pakistan
- Services: Education
- Fields: Islamic studies
- Members: 57 member states+
- Official language: Arabic, English, French
- Main organ: Organisation of Islamic Cooperation
- Affiliations: OIC
- Volunteers: World Assembly of Muslim Youth; Faith Foundation for Islamic Education, Education and Culture; Saudi Arabia; Egypt; Jordan; Lebanon; Kuwait; Malaysia; Morocco; United Kingdom; North America

World Federation of Arabo-Islamic International Schools (WFAIIS; Arabic: الاتحاد العالمي للمدارس العربية الإسلامية الدولية; French: Fédération mondiale des écoles internationales arabo-islamiques), also known as the World Federation of International Arab Islamic Schools or International Arab-Islamic Schools Federation, is an intergovernmental, international, and one of the 17 affiliated organizations of the Organisation of Islamic Cooperation that represents Arab Islamic schools and branches across the world and 57 member states. The federation has maintained a supportive environment focused on the promotion and providing assistance to Arab educational institutions. It is principally focused on dissemination of the Islamic culture, Arabic languages, the Quran in the schools and cultural centers.

Headquartered in Cairo, Egypt with regional offices in Madinah, Saudi Arabia, Peshawar Pakistan, and Kuala Lumpur, Malaysia, the federation also provide training to people in addition to creating sponsoring supervisory Arab-Islamic schools. It also propagates Islamic attitudes towards science, particularly in the Arab world, Asia, Africa, Europea and American. Registered with the UNESCO under the United Nations section c, it is recognised one of the federations that shares its idea with the UNESCO under the UN's paragraph 2/2 within the framework of the federation's main organ OIC.

== History ==
The federation was established by the OIC Council of Foreign Ministers held in Riyadh, Saudi Arabia on 26 March 1976. However, it was formally launched by the 7th session of the OIC Council of Foreign Ministers held in Istanbul, Turkey in May 1976 after the council of foreign ministers adopted a resolution no. 7/18-AF. At the time of its creation, various delegation of the World Assembly of Muslim Youth, Faith Foundation for Islamic Education, Education and Culture, Saudi Arabia, Egypt, Jordan, Lebanon, Kuwait, Malaysia, Morocco, the United Kingdom, North America and other member and non-member states participated in the summit.

It was initially headquartered in Riyadh, Saudi Arabia but was later relocated to Cairo, Egypt in 1990 AD and a resolution No. 17/7-AQ was adopted by the OIC. The 6th session of Council of Foreign Ministers took place in Jeddah, Saudi Arabia where a resolution was adopted for the dissemination of Arabic language and Islamic studies. The federation is principally focused on conducting education programs and research in the Islamic studies. The federation has been establishing Muslim educational institutions and provide financial assistance to that institution within the scope of the OIC'S charter.
