= Union of OIC News Agencies =

News network of the Organisation of Islamic Cooperation

- اتحاد وكالات أنباء دول منظمة التعاون الإسلامي
- Logo of the Organization of Islamic Cooperation news agency UNA
- Abbreviation: UNA; UNA-OIC
- Formation: March 1972; 54 years ago
- Founder: Organization of the Islamic Conference
- Founded at: Jeddah, Saudi Arabia
- Type: Organization
- Legal status: Specialized organ of the OIC
- Purpose: Promoting relations of OIC members in information broadcasting and their news agencies and furthering Islamic culture.
- Headquarters: Jeddah, Saudi Arabia
- Location: Al Madinah Al Munawarah Road, Mishrifah, Jeddah 23332, Saudi Arabia
- Region served: Worldwide
- Products: News wire News bulletins
- Fields: Mass media Journalism
- Members: 57 (2018)
- Official language: English; French; Arabic
- Parent organization: Organization of Islamic Cooperation
- Website: una-oic.org
- Formerly called: International Islamic News Agency

Union of OIC News Agencies (abbreviated as UNA and UNA-OIC), (Note: Also listed as "Union of News Agencies"; "Union of News Agencies of the OIC States" and "Union of News Agencies of the Member States of the OIC") formerly known as the International Islamic News Agency (IINA), is a specialized organ of the Organisation of Islamic Cooperation (OIC), is a news agency publishing in Arabic, English and French and focusing on news about the Islamic world and Islamic affairs. Its headquarters is in Jeddah, Saudi Arabia.

== History ==
The agency was established in 1972, under a resolution of the Third Islamic Conference of Foreign Ministers. It is financed by OIC member states. Majid bin Abdullah Al Qasabi is chairman of the Union of OIC News Agencies (UNA-OIC) Executive Council.

== See also ==
- Islamic Broadcasting Union
