= Second Extraordinary Session of the Islamic Summit Conference =

- March 4, 2003
- Host country: Qatar
- Cities: Doha
- Participants: Member states of the Organization of Islamic Cooperation (OIC)

The Second Extraordinary Session of the Islamic Summit Conference was an event held by the Organisation of the Islamic Conference (OIC) from 4–5 March 2003 in Doha, Qatar. The conference was convened in response to escalating tensions in the Middle East, with the aim of presenting a unified voice from the Islamic world against war with Iraq. However, the conference was marked by controversy and heated exchanges, particularly between Iraq and Kuwait. Despite these tensions, the conference concluded with a communique condemning Israel and rejecting a military strike against Iraq.

== Background ==
The conference was an emergency summit of the OIC, in which representatives of 56 countries gathered to discuss ways to stop the US-led war in Iraq. The emir of Qatar, Sheikh Hamad bin Khalifa al-Thani, called for the gathering, hoping to raise a united voice from the Muslim world against the war with Iraq.

== Proceedings ==
The meeting took place at a five-star hotel in Doha, just a short distance from Al Udeid, a sprawling US military base. Vice Chairman of the Revolutionary Command Council of Iraq, Izzat Ibrahim al-Duri, began his speech by quoting a verse from the Quran.

== Outcome ==
The final statement focused on condemning Israel and rejecting military action against Iraq. It also called on Iraq to respect UN and Arab summit resolutions and return Kuwaiti prisoners captured in 1990.

== Controversies ==
The conference was hotly debated between Iraq and Kuwait. Izzat Ibrahim al-Duri in his speech accused the Kuwaitis of being "agents of imperialism who have supported US troops on a massive scale year after year on Iraq's borders". This was verbally repeated with the Deputy Prime Minister of Kuwait, Sheikh Sabah Al-Ahmad. Al-Duri further insulted Sabah Al-Ahmad Al-Jaber Al-Sabah, saying "Curse your moustache!", a catchphrase that undermines the minister's dignity.
