= Islamic Chamber of Commerce, Industry and Agriculture =

International chamber of commerce

- Abbreviation: ICCIA
- Headquarters: Karachi, Pakistan
- Region served: 57 member countries
- Parent organization: Organization of Islamic Cooperation (OIC)
- Website: iccia.com

The Islamic Chamber of Commerce, Industry and Agriculture (ICCIA) is an affiliate of the Organization of Islamic Cooperation (OIC) and represents the private sector of 57 member countries. It is headquartered in Karachi, Pakistan. ICCIA was founded in 1978 and its key objective is to promote the role of the private sector in economic activity.

== Overview ==
The objective of ICCIA is to strengthen close cooperation among member countries in the fields of trade, commerce, information technology, insurance/reinsurance, shipping, banking, promotion of investment opportunities and joint ventures. It has developed a strategic plan to implement its objectives, including holding forums on special topics, setting up new companies in areas that need support, policy-making support and policy-making process involves the involvement of the private sector. The ICCIA is working in line with the OIC-2025 Program of Action, which emphasizes increasing inter-Islamic trade.

== Activities ==
The ICCIA has been actively involved in various initiatives and activities:

In February 2022, ICCIA signed an MoU with the Islamic Organization for Food Security (IOFS) on the sidelines of the IOFS Strategic Commodities and Food Safety Forum.

In March 2023, Ziauddin University (ZU) and ICCIA have signed a Memorandum of Understanding to launch the Green Waqf Initiative, a project of ICCIA.

In June 2023, The ICCIA empowered farmers and members with the goal of poverty alleviation in Lagos, Nigeria.

In July 2023, OIC Secretary General, Hissein Brahim Taha called on the ICCIA to focus on the priority areas of Small and Medium Enterprises (SMEs) and Micro-, Small and Medium-sized Enterprises (MSMEs), digitization, investment and tourism-specific programs to be implemented in 2023 and 2024.

In July 2023, ICCIA signed an MOU with the Small and Medium Business Development Agency of the Republic of Azerbaijan (KOBİA) on the occasion of the 35th meeting of the board of directors of ICCIA.

== See also ==
- Agerskovgruppen
- FAO GM Foods Platform
- Association for Vertical Farming
