= Fifth Extraordinary Session of the Islamic Summit Conference =

- March 6, 2016
- Host country: Indonesia
- Cities: Jakarta
- Participants: Member states of the Organization of Islamic Cooperation (OIC)

The Fifth Extraordinary Session of the Islamic Summit Conference was held from 6–7 March 2016 in Jakarta, Indonesia. The heads of the 57 member countries of the Organization of Islamic Cooperation (OIC), including notable figures such as the Vice President of Indonesia, Muhammad Jusuf Kalla, and Sudan’s President Omar al-Bashir participated in the summit. The conference aimed to address various pressing issues affecting the Muslim world, including internal and external conflicts in the Middle East, radicalism, and current terrorism. The summit also reaffirmed support for Palestine and called for an international ban on products from Israeli settlements in the West Bank.

== Preparations ==
Indonesian President Joko Widodo and his vice president called for calm as tensions rose ahead of a planned demonstration by Muslim groups against Jakarta's governor, a Christian and the first ethnic Chinese in office. The protester groups claimed that Governor Basuki Tjahaja Purnama, had insulted the Quran and was guilty of blasphemy. Security was tightened in Jakarta, a sprawling city of 10 million, with police deploying armored vehicles and armed personnel.

== Attendees ==
As the host country, Indonesia sent invitations to 56 world leaders to attend the extraordinary summit. Indonesia's Vice President Muhammad Jusuf Kalla played an important role in the summit. Sudanese President Omar al-Bashir also went to Indonesia to attend the summit.

== Agenda and discussions ==
The purpose of the summit was to discuss various important issues affecting the Muslim world. The second day of the summit focused on internal and external conflicts, radicalization and current terrorism in the Middle East.

Support for Palestine was also reiterated in the meeting. Indonesia reiterated its commitment to Palestine as the host country at the summit.

Apart from political talks, agreements were also reached on cooperation in various fields. For example, Bangladesh and Indonesia agreed to work together in the energy sector during the summit.

== Outcomes ==
The summit concluded with a final declaration issued by the OIC. One of the main outcomes of the summit was a call for an international embargo on products from Israeli settlements in the West Bank. The initiative aims to support the "inalienable rights" of Palestinians.
