= First Extraordinary Session of the Islamic Summit Conference =

Organization of Islamic Cooperation (OIC) event in 1997

- March 23, 1997
- Host country: Pakistan
- Cities: Islamabad
- Participants: Member states of the Organization of Islamic Cooperation (OIC)

The First Extraordinary Session of the Islamic Summit Conference was held from 23 to 24 March 1997 in Islamabad, Pakistan. Organized by the Organization of Islamic Cooperation (OIC). The conference was convened on the occasion of the Golden Jubilee celebrations of Pakistan's independence. The event saw participation from various Muslim countries, providing a platform to discuss and resolve issues related to the Muslim world. A key outcome of the conference was the establishment of the Humanitarian Trust Fund to provide aid to Afghanistan. The conference also marked a special occasion for Pakistan Post, which issued a commemorative stamp in honor of the event.

== Background ==
Pakistan has been an active member of OIC since its inception. It has hosted many OIC events, including the Second OIC Summit in Lahore in February 1974. Pakistan's participation in the OIC and its active role in promoting peace and harmony in the region have been recognized by international personalities such as UN Secretary-General Kofi Annan.

On this occasion, the Pakistan Post issued a commemorative stamp on which the Organization of the Islamic Conference logo and the number 50 were printed and the words "Golden Jubilee Celebrations of Pakistan and Special Summit of the Organization of Islamic Countries 23rd March 1997 Islamabad" were printed. The design of this Rs.2 commemorative stamp was provided by the Ministry of Interior of Pakistan.

== The Conference ==
Muslim kings and heads of state of different countries participated in the conference. It served as a platform for these leaders to discuss and resolve issues related to the Muslim world. OIC Secretary General Hissein Brahim Taha was among the main speakers of this event.

== Outcomes ==
A number of resolutions were passed as a result of the conference. A key resolution was the establishment of the Humanitarian Trust Fund, which was intended to provide humanitarian aid to Afghanistan. The Islamic Development Bank was tasked with operationalizing the fund by the first quarter of 1998.
