= Seventh Extraordinary Session of the Islamic Summit Conference =

- May 18, 2018
- Host country: Turkey
- Cities: Istanbul
- Participants: Member states of the Organization of Islamic Cooperation (OIC)

The Seventh Extraordinary Session of the Islamic Summit Conference was an event organized by the Organization of Islamic Cooperation (OIC) on 18 May 2018 in Istanbul, Turkey. The conference was organized in response to the serious developments in the State of Palestine.

== Overview ==
The summit was convened by Turkish President Recep Tayyip Erdoğan, who chaired the summit. The conference was held on 18 May 2018 in Istanbul, Republic of Turkey. The summit was attended by monarchs and heads of state and government of the OIC member states.

== Purpose ==
The purpose of the summit was to focus on the alarming situation and rising tensions in the occupied territory of the State of Palestine. The conference was called in response to the ongoing Israeli aggression against the Palestinian people and the illegal opening of the US embassy in Jerusalem.

== Final communique ==
The Final Declaration of the Seventh Extraordinary Islamic Summit was a document that outlined the collective positions and decisions of the OIC member states. The declaration condemned the ongoing Israeli aggression against the Palestinian people and the illegal opening of the American embassy in Al-Quds.

== Outcomes ==
Turkey, serving as OIC president, hosted the summit to condemn Israel's actions in Gaza.

Iranian President Hassan Rouhani has urged Muslim countries to sever ties with Israel and reconsider their economic ties with the United States.

Pakistani Prime Minister Shahid Khaqan Abbasi has advocated for a comprehensive and impartial inquiry into the incidents in Gaza. Abbasi, while expressing concern over the reported human rights infringements by the Israeli forces, is expected to reaffirm Pakistan's government and its citizens' support for the creation of a sustainable, independent, and connected Palestine.

In response to the violence faced by the Palestinians and aimed at ensuring their safety, the summit called for the creation of an international protection force for the Palestinians.

== Aftermath ==
After the summit, Egyptian President Abdel Fattah al-Sisi announced that he would open the Rafah crossing to Gaza for a month, allowing Palestinians to pass through during Ramadan.
