= Independent Permanent Human Rights Commission =

Principal organ of the Organisation of Islamic Cooperation

- Arabic: الهيئة الدائمة المستقلة لحقوق الإنسان; French: Commission permanente indépendante des droits de l'homme
- Official patch of IPHRC
- Abbreviation: IPHRC
- Formation: 7 December 2005; 20 years ago
- Founded at: Mecca, Saudi Arabia
- Type: Nonprofit
- Legal status: Foundation
- Professional title: Promotion of human rights
- Location: Jeddah, Saudi Arabia
- Region served: Worldwide
- Fields: Human rights
- Members: 57 member states
- Official language: Arabic, English, French
- Main organ: Organisation of Islamic Cooperation
- Website: oic-iphrc.org

The Independent Permanent Human Rights Commission (IPHRC; Arabic: الهيئة الدائمة المستقلة لحقوق الإنسان; French: Commission permanente indépendante des droits de l'homme) is a human rights agency and one of the principal organs of the Organisation of Islamic Cooperation advocating for human rights within the scope of its 57 member states. It takes activities as an independent commission of the OIC and also advises its policymaking bodies and decision-making authority within the framework of human rights and fundamental rights.

The IPHRC serves for member and non-member states on the existing human rights mechanism under the international standards outlined for independence and professionalism as per its mandate granted by the OIC's charter in various sessions first session being held between 7 and 8 December 2005 in the 3rd Extraordinary Islamic Summit hosted by Saudi Arabia – Mecca.

== History ==
The Independent Permanent Human Rights Commission (IPHRC) was commissioned in 2005 after the OIC Council of Foreign Ministers held a programme titled "OIC Ten-Year Programme of Action". A resolution was adopted by the 3rd Extraordinary Islamic Summit held in Mecca, Saudi Arabia on 7 December 2005. However, the partial formation of the commission took place by 11th Islamic Summit which was hosted between 13 and 14 March 2008 by Senegal in Dakar. It was formally created by the 38th session of the Council of Foreign Ministers between 28 and 30 June 2011 in Astana, Kazakhstan.

After the commission was officially recognised by the member states, its Secretariat was moved to its headquarters in March 2017. The independent headquarter building was given by Saudi Arabia which also serves as its host country. The commission has also set up principle guidelines to be made functional. The five guidelines include; the principles of complementarity, introspection, prioritization, incremental measures and credibility.

In the first five years, the commission focused on critical issues concerning women's and children's rights in the field of education. The commission identified right to education as a primary component for the rights of women and children. The IPHRC also identified right to development as one of the main measures for the development. It also identifies islamophobia, Muslim minorities and the Israeli–Palestinian conflict as the critical challenges.

The commission has been actively offering assistance to its member states on several issues concerning domestic legislations and obligations under the international human rights instruments.

== Objectives ==
The IPHRC actively offer advice to decision-making bodies involving human rights. It also conduct research and studies in the same field, in addition to advocacing for human and fundamental rights of Muslim minority rights of the member and non-member states under the Universal Declaration of Human Rights with additional focus on Islamic principles, justice and equality. It also provides assistance for technical cooperation. The IPHRC is also entrusted with interfaith and intercultural dialogue as an instrumental inception for the promotion of peace and the Islamic values as described in its charter.

It also reviews OIC's human rights activities and provide advice on recommended measures necessary for the improvement of human rights mechanism. The actively collaborates with the United Nations bodies and the OIC itself. It provides support for civil society groups, organizations and individuals associated with the same field. As a cross-regional human rights agency, it promotes universal values of the member and non-member states. It also serves as one of organisations that prevents duplicate publication concerning human rights protection and promotion.

== Commission membership ==
The IPHRC consists of 18 professional human rights trained members. They are elected by the OIC Council of Foreign Ministers from three continents such as Arab, Africa and Asia with 6 members from each continent. Nominated by their own governments, members are elected for a term of three years. A member may serve in the commission only twice and cannot hold the position for the third term. Term is renewable only once.

== Sessions ==
The IPHRC organise two annual 5 to 10 days long session focused on its principles. Dates are decided by the OIC Secretariat and IPHRC's bureau. OIC's executive director is responsible for the preparation and submission of Draft Agenda and Programme of Works to commission members for the final approval.

=== Session documents ===
Sessions documents consists of reports, proceedings, conclusion and recommendations. The Secretary General of the Organisation of Islamic Cooperation is responsible for the presentation of session report annually to the Council of Foreign Ministers. It contains a comprehensive session report, including IPHRC'S activities.

=== List of reports ===
Document No.	Date	Title	Ref(s)
1	28 April–1 May 2014	Human Rights Situation in the Central African Republic (CAR)	
2	4–9 April 2016	Visit to Palestine	
3	27–29 March 2017	Fact Finding Visit to the State of Azad Jammu and Kashmir to Assess Human Rights Situation in the Indian Occupied Kashmir	
4	2–6 January 2018	Fact Finding Visit to Rohingya Refugees Camps in Bangladesh to Assess Human Rights Situation of Rohingya Muslim Minority in Myanmar	
