= Islamic Centre for Development of Trade =

Subsidiary organs of the Organisation of Islamic Cooperation

- Arabic: المركز الاسلامي لتنمية التجارة; French: Centre islamique pour le développement du commerce
- Official patch of ICDT
- Abbreviation: ICDT
- Formation: 1984; 42 years ago
- Founder: Organisation of Islamic Cooperation
- Founded at: Casablanca, Morocco
- Type: Subsidiary organ
- Legal status: Foundation
- Purpose: Trade promotion
- Headquarters: Tour Des Habous, Avenue des F.A.R
- Location: Casablanca, Morocco
- Origins: Morocco
- Region served: Arab world, Middle East, Asia, Africa
- Fields: Economic development
- Members: 57 member states
- Official language: Arabic, English, French
- Director general: Latifa El Bouabdellaoui
- Main organ: Organisation of Islamic Cooperation
- Website: icdt-cidc.org

Islamic Centre for Development of Trade (ICDT; Arabic: المركز الاسلامي لتنمية التجارة; French: Centre islamique pour le développement du commerce CIDC) is an intergovernmental organization and one of the seven subsidiary organs of the Organisation of Islamic Cooperation entrusted with the promotion of trade, economic development and commercial cooperation in public and private sectors across the 57 member states.

It plays a regular role in trade exchange and investment mechanism focused on economy promotion in the member states. It also maintains an environment support for its associated nations in obtaining access to global marketing, in addition to conducting negotiation with other international organisations, groups and enterprises in the field of trade.

== History ==
Headquartered in Casablanca, Morocco, Islamic Centre for Development of Trade establishment resolution was adopted by the Third Extraordinary Session of the Islamic Summit Conference in 1981. The approval session was held in Mecca, Saudi Arabia. It was formally launched as a subsidiary organ in 1984 from it founding location Casablanca, Morocco.

From June 21 to 23, 2021, the Islamic Centre for the Development of Trade launched a webinar on the state of play of multilateral trade negotiations at the World Trade Organization (WTO).

In September 2021, a memorandum was signed by Expo Centre Sharjah, the Arab Federation for International Exhibitions and Conferences, the Council of Arab Economic Unity, and the Arab League for collaboration with the ICDT to maintain a single supportive environment in the field of trade developments and economic exhibitions across the 57 member states.

In February 2022, the Moroccan Association of Exporters (ASMEX) and the Islamic Center for the Development of Trade (CIDC) signed a partnership agreement to develop activities for the benefit of the members of this association, to create partnership links between Asmex members and importers in other countries.

During the 39th session of the Board of Directors (CA) of the Islamic Centre for the Development of Trade, held on 07 and 08 March 2022 in Marrakech, a new office was formed and is composed of Saudi Arabia, Bangladesh, Cameroon, Ivory Coast, Indonesia, Morocco, Nigeria, Pakistan and Tunisia.

In a conference organized on May 10, 2022, in Rabat, the Islamic Centre for the Development of Trade announces the holding of the 17th OIC Trade Fair which will take place from June 13 to 19, 2022, in Dakar under the high patronage of President Macky Sall from Senegal.

In December 2022, the Islamic Development Bank and the Islamic Centre for the Development of Trade recently concluded a workshop on the digitization of services in investment promotion agencies in the Organization of Islamic Cooperation’s member states.

The Islamic Centre for Development of Trade (ICDT) organized, on March 6th and 7th, 2023 in Kampala, Uganda, the 1st edition of the Coffee Forum of Member States of the Organization of Islamic Cooperation (OIC), in partnership with the Ministry of Trade, Industry and Cooperatives of the Republic of Uganda and the Uganda Coffee Development Authority (UCDA).

In March 2023, the Islamic Centre for the Development of Trade (CIDC), in collaboration with the Agency for the Promotion of Investments in Mauritania, is organizing the second edition of the investment forum "Investment Days of the Islamic Center for the Development of Trade".

== Investment ==
The ICDT conducted several trade developments amounting $271.45 billion in 2005 which increased to $878 billion in 2015. The organisation, along with 57 member states made an investment of 223% of its total budget between 2005 and 2015. The United Arab Emirates ranks 1st in trade investment of $121.7 billion roughly equivalent to 15.2%, while Turkey has spent $77.8 billion roughly equivalent to 9.7%. Saudi Arabia has also contributed within the scope of organisation. It has made an investment of $74.3 billion, which is roughly equivalent 9.3%.

Countries associated with the Gulf Cooperation Council has made an investment of 35% collectively, while Asian countries has made 31% of investment. The Middle East countries has made a contribution of 24% while Sub-Saharan Africa contributed with 7%. The countries associated with the Arab Maghreb Union has made a contribution of 5% since its association with the ICDT.

Within the framework of its trade policy, it increases its investment from 18.7% in 2016 to 21.2% in 2018. The organisation witnessed a total increment of 13.5% between 2016 and 2018.

== Board of directors ==
The Board of Directors consists of 9 members, one of which represents the host country. These members are elected from a list of candidates provided by the Member States and serve for a period of three years. They have the option to be re-elected for an additional term. The principle of equitable geographical distribution is followed during the election process.

The Board of Directors is required to convene at least once annually. Their responsibilities include developing program policies and providing technical oversight for the activities of the Centre.

The members of the board of Directors for the period of 2022 to 2024 :

Republic of Bangladesh

Republic of Cameroon

Republic of Côte d'Ivoire

Republic of Indonesia

Kingdom of Morocco

Federal Republic of Nigeria

Islamic Republic of Pakistan

Kingdom of Saudi Arabia

Republic of Tunisia

== General Managers ==
2022-2024: Latifa El Bouabdellaoui

2013-2022: El Hssane Hzaine

2011-2013: Mohanna Al Mohanaa

2000-2011: Allal Rachdi
