= Islamic Committee of the International Crescent =

Islamic relief organization of the OIC

- Arabic: اللجنة الإسلامية للهلال الدولي; French: Comité islamique du Croissant international
- Abbreviation: ICIC
- Formation: 16 May 1977; 49 years ago
- Founded at: Tripoli, Libya
- Type: Nonprofit relief organization
- Legal status: Charity
- Purpose: Humanitarian aid
- Location: Benghazi, Libya
- Fields: 57 member states
- Official languages: Arabic, English, French
- Owner: Organisation of Islamic Cooperation
- Main organ: Organisation of Islamic Cooperation
- Publication: Committee
- Affiliations: Islamic Development Bank; Qatar Red Crescent Society; North Cyprus Red Crescent Society; International Federation of Red Cross and Red Crescent Societies

Islamic Committee of the International Crescent (ICIC; Arabic: اللجنة الإسلامية للهلال الدولي; French: Comité islamique du Croissant international), is an Islamic relief organization and one of the eight specialized institutions of the Organisation of Islamic Cooperation designed to serve as the main component of humanitarian aid to the 57 member states in times of the state of emergency caused by the natural disaster or military conflicts. It mainly provides medical assistance to the affected sovereign states, including permanent and non permanent member states.

It collaborates with other international organisations, including the Qatar Red Crescent Society, the International Red Cross and Red Crescent Movement, the International Federation of Red Cross and Red Crescent Societies and other networks of Red Cross and Red Crescent Societies for a speedy humanitarian aid. The affiliated Islamic humanitarian organisations also participate its sessions held annually. However, Turkish Red Crescent has been a board member of ICIC since its formation in 1977.

== History ==
Affiliated with the Islamic Solidarity Fund and the Islamic Development Bank, ICIC was established in Libya after the OIC Council of Foreign Ministers adopted a resolution No. (11/8-c) on 16 May 1977 in the 8th session held in Tripoli, Libya. Before the resolution 11/8 was adopted, Libya and the OIC General Secretariat hosted several other meetings in collaboration with a group of jurists that framed an agreement draft for the formation of the Islamic Committee of International Crescent. Besides the participation of Libya and OIC, the Council of Foreign Ministers briefly discussed during the matter in five successive sessions. The formal adoption of the ICIC took place in the 12th session held on 6 June (i.e. 29 rajab to 4th shaaban). The final approval for the establishment of the ICIC came into existence by adopting a resolution No. 4/12 which took place in Baghdad, Iraq.

Before ICIC came into force on 20 June 2008 in Kampala, the OIC issued a resolution No. 3/13 by the participation of Council of Foreign Ministers, Saudi Arabia, Cameroon, Turkey, Mali, Indonesia, Kuwait, Senegal, Qatar Libya and OIC General Secretariat. Between 25 and 29 April 1993, 21st session was hosted in Karachi, Pakistan in 1993 that was predominantly focused on the formation of ICIC. Libya and OIC General Secretariat serves as its permanent representatives while member states serves as non permanent representatives.

It is currently headquartered in Benghazi. At the time of its establishment, 9 member states, including Indonesia, Morocco, Mali, Saudi Arabia, Senegal, Guinea, Turkey, Iran and Libya became its permanent representatives.

== Criticism on affiliation ==
In alleged violation of the international humanitarian law, ICIC allegedly ignored the recognition application of the North Cyprus Red Crescent Society. It is only recognised by Hellenic Red Cross. However, a declaration was signed in 2019 by the 47 member states out of 57 urging ICIC to officially recognise North Cyprus Red Crescent Society.
