= Islamic Broadcasting Union =

Telecommunication body of the OIC

- Arabic: إتحاد الإذاعات الإسلامية; French: Union islamique de radiodiffusion
- Abbreviation: IBU
- Formation: 24 July 1974; 52 years ago
- Founder: Organisation of Islamic Cooperation
- Founded at: Jeddah, Saudi Arabia
- Type: Broadcasting
- Legal status: Radio and television broadcasting
- Professional title: Promote Arabic languages, Islam, and highlight issues concerning Muslim world
- Headquarters: Jeddah
- Location: Saudi Arabia
- Region served: Worldwide
- Methods: Telecommunications
- Fields: Journalism
- Members: 57 member states
- Official language: Arabic, English, French
- President: Amr el-Leithy
- Main organ: Organisation of Islamic Cooperation
- Formerly called: Islamic States Broadcasting Organization

Islamic Broadcasting Union (IBU Arabic: إتحاد الإذاعات الإسلامية; French: Union islamique de radiodiffusion) formerly known as Islamic States Broadcasting Organization (ISBO), is a media and public relations wing and one of the specialised body of the Organization of Islamic Cooperation focused on the promotion of Islam and mutual cooperation between the 57 member states through by producing several radio programs. It also televises programs concerning the same issues, in addition to working for the promotion of Arabic languages. Predominantly working in the field of journalism, it highlights the social, political and cultural challenges across the Muslim nations.

== History ==
IBU was established as Islamic States Broadcasting Organization (ISBO) by adopting a resolution in the 6th summit of the OIC Council of Foreign Ministers hosted in Jeddah, Saudi Arabia in July 1975. It also headquartered in Jeddah, Saudi Arabia.

In 2022, IBU signed a formal agreement with the Jordanian and Arab States Broadcasting Union to produce and telecast joint radio and television programs across the Arab world. Both unions established a representative office to supervise radio and television networks affiliated with IBU.

Prior to signing an agreement with the Arab States Broadcasting Union, the IBU signed a formal deal with the members states to form a committee focused on the development of the IBU. The committee consist members from different countries such as Saudi Arabia, Palestine, Egypt, Tunisia, Jordan and Qatar. The idea to form a committee was originally introduced by the IBU president or director general Amr El-Leithi.

=== Objectives ===
It is objectively focused on propagating dawah and promotion of the mutual cooperation between the member states pertaining to broadcasting. It also serves as one of the main sources to highlight the objectives of the OIC.
