= List of largest cities in the Organisation of Islamic Cooperation member countries =

This is a list of the largest cities in the Organisation of Islamic Cooperation member states, based on the United Nations World Urbanization Prospects report (2010 population estimates from the report's 2007 revision).

Urban agglomerations
Rank	City	Images	Population	Country	Statistical concept	Area (km^{2})
1	Jakarta		30,214,303	Indonesia	Urban agglomeration	6,392
2	Karachi		24,700,000	Pakistan	Urban agglomeration	4,966
3	Dhaka		22,690,116	Bangladesh	Urban agglomeration	2,161
4	Cairo		18,420,000	Egypt	Official metropolitan area	1,310
5	Lagos		17,060,307	Nigeria	Urban agglomeration	907
6	Istanbul		14,500,000	Turkey	Metropolitan municipality	5,343
7	Tehran		13,532,000	Iran	City proper	1,489
8	Lahore		13,004,135	Pakistan	Urban agglomeration	1,772
9	Bandung		8,199,892	Indonesia	Urban agglomeration	1,876
10	Faisalabad		7,873,910	Pakistan	Urban agglomeration	1,097
11	Rawalpindi		7,412,205	Pakistan	Metropolitan Area	6,451
12	Surabaya		7,302,283	Indonesia	Urban agglomeration	2,787
13	Baghdad		6,625,000	Iraq	Metropolitan area	730
14	Semarang		6,544,289	Indonesia	Urban agglomeration	5,287
15	Kuala Lumpur		6,088,000	Malaysia	Metropolitan area	673
16	Riyadh		5,666,000	Saudi Arabia	City proper	1,550
17	Khartoum		5,185,000	Sudan	Urban agglomeration	580
18	Ankara		5,045,083	Turkey	Urban agglomeration	2,516
19	Gujranwala		5,014,196	Pakistan	Urban agglomeration	1,556
20	Chittagong		5,012,000	Bangladesh	Official metropolitan area	990
21	Multan		4,745,109	Pakistan	City District	3,721
22	Alexandria		4,421,000	Egypt	City proper	2,970
23	Casablanca		4,270,750	Morocco	Urban agglomeration	1,615
24	Peshawar		4,269,079	Pakistan	Urban agglomeration	1,257
25	Abidjan		4,175,000	Ivory Coast	Urban agglomeration	2,550
26	Medan		4,103,696	Indonesia	Metropolitan area	1,991
27	Yogyakarta		4,010,436	Indonesia	Urban agglomeration	1,900
28	Sargodha		3,903,588	Pakistan	City District	5,854
29	Sialkot		3,893,672	Pakistan	City District	3,016
30	Kabul		3,768,000	Afghanistan	City proper	275
31	Bahawalpur		3,668,106	Pakistan	City District	24,830
32	Algiers		3,500,000	Algeria	Urban agglomeration	363
33	Mashhad		3,131,586	Iran	City proper	3,946

== See also ==
- Organisation of Islamic Cooperation
- Islamic World
- Metropolitan areas
- List of cities in the European Union by population within city limits
