= Maldives Inland Revenue Authority =

Autonomous taxation body in the Maldives

- MIRA
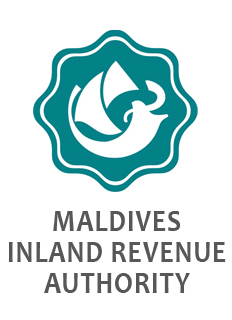

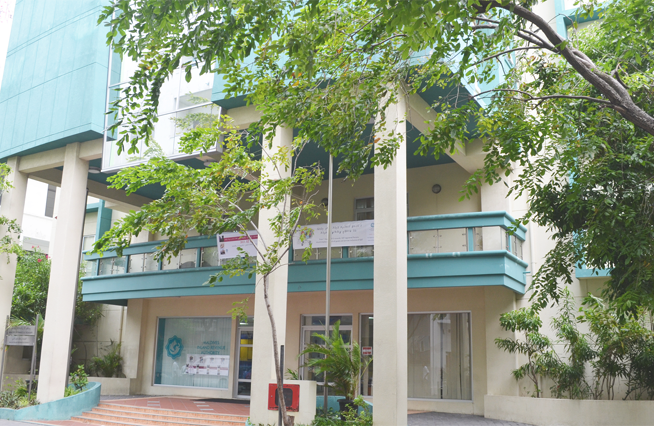

Agency overview
- Formed: 2 August 2010
- Type: Revenue service
- Jurisdiction: Republic of Maldives
- Headquarters: Maldives Inland Revenue Authority, Ameenee Magu, Male’ 20379, Republic of Maldives
- Employees: 282 (April 2018)
- Agency executives: Commissioner General of Taxation; Deputy Commissioner General of Taxation, Asma Shafeeu
- Website: www.mira.gov.mv

The Maldives Inland Revenue Authority (MIRA) is a fully autonomous body responsible for tax administration in the Maldives. The main responsibilities of MIRA include execution of tax laws, implementation of tax policies and providing technical advice to the government in determining tax policies. The Tax Administration Act stipulates the other responsibilities of MIRA.

== History ==
MIRA was established on August 2, 2010, as a separate and independent legal entity. Following the establishment of MIRA, a modern tax system was introduced to the Maldives via the Tourism Goods and Services Tax Act in January 2011 and the Business Profit Tax Act in July 2011. The Tourism Goods and Services Tax Act was replaced by the Goods and Services Tax Act in October 2011.

== Laws & Regulations Administered ==
MIRA administers a number of laws and regulations. In addition to the administration of tax laws, MIRA also collects a number of fees and levies.

=== Income Tax Act ===
Income Tax is levied under the Income Tax Act (Law Number 25/2019). The act was published in the Government Gazette on 17 December 2019 and taxation under the act is set to commence on 1 January 2020. However, remuneration will come within the purview of income effective 1 April 2020. The Business Profit Tax regime imposed under the Business Profit Tax Act would be repealed with the commencement of Income Tax.

Tax residents of Maldives are taxed on their worldwide income, whereas non-residents are taxed on the income derived from Maldives. The Income Tax Act covers income received through conducting business, employment income, and banking.

=== Tourism Goods & Services Tax Act ===
The Tourism Goods and Services Tax (T-GST) Act came into effect on January 1, 2011. Under the Act, T-GST is charged on the value of goods and services supplied by tourist resorts, tourist hotels, guest houses, picnic islands and tourist vessels, and on certain other services supplied by places providing services to tourists in the Maldives. The tax rate under the Act was 3.5%. The T-GST Act was abolished following the commencement of the Goods and Services Tax Act.

=== Goods & Services Tax Act ===
In October 2011, the T-GST regime was repealed and replaced by the Goods and Services Tax (GST) Act. The GST Act came into effect on 2 October 2011, and expanded the tax to all sectors of the economy. The Act imposed a GST at the rate of 3.5% from 2 October 2011 to 31 December 2011 and 6% from 1 January 2012 to 31 December 2012. The GST rate on “tourism goods and services” increased to 8% on 1 January 2013 and to 12% on 1 November 2014.

Following the COVID-19 pandemic GST rates were revised upwards from 1st January 2023. The current rates are 16% for the tourism sector and 8% for the general sector.

=== Business Profit Tax Act ===
The Business Profit Tax (BPT) Act came into effect on 18 July 2011. Under the Act, tax is imposed at the rate of 15% on profits exceeding MVR 500,000 (approx. USD 32,425) in a tax year. A lower rate of 5% is applicable to companies resident in the Maldives generating all of their income from outside the Maldives. Further, if any payment specified in Section 6 of the Act is made by a business to a non-resident, a withholding tax at the rate of 10% is imposed on the gross amount of such payment.

The tax regimes imposed under the Business Profit Tax Act and Bank Profit Tax Act were repealed with the commencement of Income Tax on 1 January 2020.

=== Green Tax ===
Green tax is a tax payable by tourists who stay in tourist resorts, tourist hotels and tourist vessels. It is also payable by tourists who stay in tourist guesthouses from 1 October 2016 onwards. Green tax is payable at the rate of 6 United States Dollars per day of stay from tourist resorts, tourist hotels and tourist vessels. A lower rate of 3 United States Dollars per day is charged for tourist guesthouses and hotels on local islands that have less than 50 rooms. Maldivians and resident permit holders are not required to pay Green Tax.

=== Bank Profit Tax Act ===
Banks operating in the Maldives are required to pay 25% of taxable profit as Bank Profit Tax. Banks are exempt from paying Business Profit Tax. The Business Profit Tax Act was repealed with the commencement of the Income Tax on 1 January 2020.

=== Airport Taxes and Fees Act ===
This Act prescribes all matters relating to the levying of Airport Service Charge as a tax and Airport Development Fee as a fee, on passengers departing from the Maldives from an airport in the Maldives. Airport Service Charge (ASC) is levied on passengers departing from the Maldives from an airport in the Maldives, at a rate of US$25 per foreign passenger and US$12 per Maldivian passenger. Persons with diplomatic immunity, transit passengers and children under the age of 2 are exempt from ASC. Airport Development Fee (ADF), in addition to ASC, will be levied on passengers departing from Velana International Airport on or after 1 May 2017, at a rate of US$25 per foreign passenger and US$12 per Maldivian passenger. Only passengers with diplomatic immunity are exempted from ADF.

=== Income Tax Act ===
Income Tax is levied under the Income Tax Act (Law Number 25/2019). The act was published in the Government Gazette on 17 December 2019 and taxation under the act commenced on 1 January 2020. However, remuneration came within the purview of income effective 1 April 2020. The tax regimes imposed under the Business Profit Tax Act and Bank Profit Tax Act were repealed with the commencement of Income Tax.

Residents of the Maldives are taxed on their worldwide income, whereas non-residents and temporary residents are taxed on the income derived from the Maldives only.

Tax rates and brackets applicable to individuals are given below. The total tax payable of an individual is calculated by allocating the total taxable income of the individual to the appropriate tax brackets and applying the respective rates.

| Tax bracket for taxable income derived in an accounting period | Tax rate |
| Not exceeding MVR 720,000 | 0% |
| More than MVR 720,000 but not exceeding MVR 1,200,000 | 5.5% |
| More than MVR 1,200,000 but not exceeding MVR 1,800,000 | 8% |
| More than MVR 1,800,000 but not exceeding MVR 2,400,000 | 12% |
| More than MVR 2,400,000 | 15% |

Companies are taxed at the following rates. [Not applicable to banks]

| Tax bracket for taxable income derived in an accounting period | Tax rate |
| Not exceeding MVR 500,000 | 0% |
| More than MVR 500,000 | 15% |

== Organization ==
The Commissioner General of Taxation and the Deputy Commissioner General of Taxation of the MIRA is appointed by the President with the approval of the People's Majlis.

=== Commissioner General of Taxation ===
The Commissioner General of Taxation shall carry out the functions of the Commissioner General of Taxation as prescribed in the Tax Administration Act and in any other tax law, and oversee the day-to-day administration of the MIRA. On 2 August 2019, Mr. Yazeed Mohamed was appointed as the first Commissioner General of Taxation. The next Commissioner General of Taxation was Mr. Fathuhulla Jameel, who was appointed on 31 October 2019.

=== Deputy Commissioner General of Taxation ===
The functions of the Deputy Commissioner General of Taxation shall include discharging the duties of the Commissioner General of Taxation in the event that the Commissioner General is unable to attend to the work of the MIRA, and carrying out any other work determined by the Commissioner General. Mr. Hassan Zareer was appointed as the first Deputy Commissioner General of Taxation on 2 August 2019. The current Deputy Commissioner General of Taxation, Ms. Asma Shafeeu, was appointed on 31 October 2019.

== Governance structure ==
Members of the Board of Directors of MIRA consists of 7 members including a member appointed by the Ministry of Finance and Treasury, the Commissioner General of Taxation and five members appointed by the President with the approval of the People's Majlis. The chairperson of the Board is the member appointed by the Ministry of Finance and Treasury. The Board is responsible for determining the administrative policies of the MIRA.

Members currently serving on the Board are:

1. Mr. Ahmed Saaid Musthafa (Chairperson)
2. Mr. Husham Waheed (Deputy chairperson)
3. Mr. Hassan Zareer (Commissioner General of Taxation)
4. Ms. Dhaha Shuaib (Board Member)
5. Mr. Mohamed Imthinan Saudulla (Board Member)
6. Mr. Ismail Hamdhoon Member (Board Member)
7. Uz. Ahmed Ali Member (Board Member)

== Performance ==
In 2011, MIRA collected MVR 4.6 billion in revenue, which is 89% higher than the collection in 2010 (by the former Department of Inland Revenue and MIRA) – the newly introduced taxes explain the increase. In 2012, MIRA collected MVR 7.2 billion (approx. USD 466.9 million), which is an increase of 57% compared to 2011. In 2013, MIRA collected MVR 8.9 billion (approx. USD 580.1 million), which is an increase of 24% compared to 2012. In 2014 MIRA collected MVR 11.5 billion and in 2015 MIRA collected MVR 13.05 billion. In 2016, MIRA collected MVR 14.52 billion which represents an increment of 11.3% compared to the previous year. MIRA collected MVR 15.18 billion in 2017, which is an increment of 4.5% compared to the revenue collected in 2016. In 2018, MIRA collected MVR 16.36 billion which represents an increment of 7% compared to the previous year.

Table 1 –Total revenue collection from 2010 to 2024 (in MVR billion)

| Financial year | 2010 | 2011 | 2012 | 2013 | 2014 | 2015 | 2016 | 2017 | 2018 | 2019 | 2020 | 2021 | 2022 | 2023 | 2024 |
| Total tax revenue | 2.4 | 4.6 | 7.2 | 9.0 | 11.5 | 13.1 | 14.6 | 15.3 | 16.4 | 16.8 | 10.5 | 15.75 | 22.12 | 24.86 | 28.10 |
