= Statistical, Economic and Social Research and Training Centre for Islamic Countries =

Turkish-based research organization

SESRIC
- Type: International Organisation
- Founded: 1978
- Headquarters: Ankara, Turkey
- Key people: H.E. Zehra Zümrüt Selçuk, Director General
- Website: Official website

The Statistical, Economic and Social Research and Training Centre for Islamic Countries (SESRIC), was founded as a subsidiary organ of the Organisation of Islamic Cooperation (OIC) in pursuance of Resolution No. 2/8-E adopted by the Eighth Islamic Conference of Foreign Ministers (ICFM), held in Tripoli in May 1977. The Centre started its activities in Ankara on 1 June 1978.

== Mandate ==
The basic mandate drawn up for SESRIC is threefold:

- To collate, process and disseminate socio-economic statistics and information on and for the utilisation of the member countries,
- To study and evaluate the economic and social developments in the member countries to help generate proposals that will initiate and enhance co-operation among them, and
- To organise training programmes in selected fields geared to the needs of the member countries as well as to the general objectives of the Organisation of Islamic Cooperation.

In addition to the implementation of the above-mentioned mandate, the Centre assumes the role of focal point for the technical co-operation activities and projects between the OIC system and the related UN agencies. It also acts as the major research arm of the OIC whereby it is assigned the task of preparing the main economic and social reports and background documents for the multitude of economic, social and technical co-operation meetings and conferences held at different levels under the umbrella of the OIC every year.

== Directors General ==
Name	Term
Dr. Şadi Cindoruk	1 June 1978 - 30 April 1998
Ambassador Erdinç Erdün	1 May 1998 – 30 April 2006
Dr. Savaş Alpay	1 May 2006 – 26 March 2015
Ambassador Musa Kulaklıkaya	27 March 2015 – 26 March 2019
Mr. Nebil Dabur	27 March 2019 – 26 March 2013
H.E. Zehra Zümrüt Selçuk	27 March 2023 – Present

== Headquarters ==
The Center is located in Ankara, Republic of Turkey.

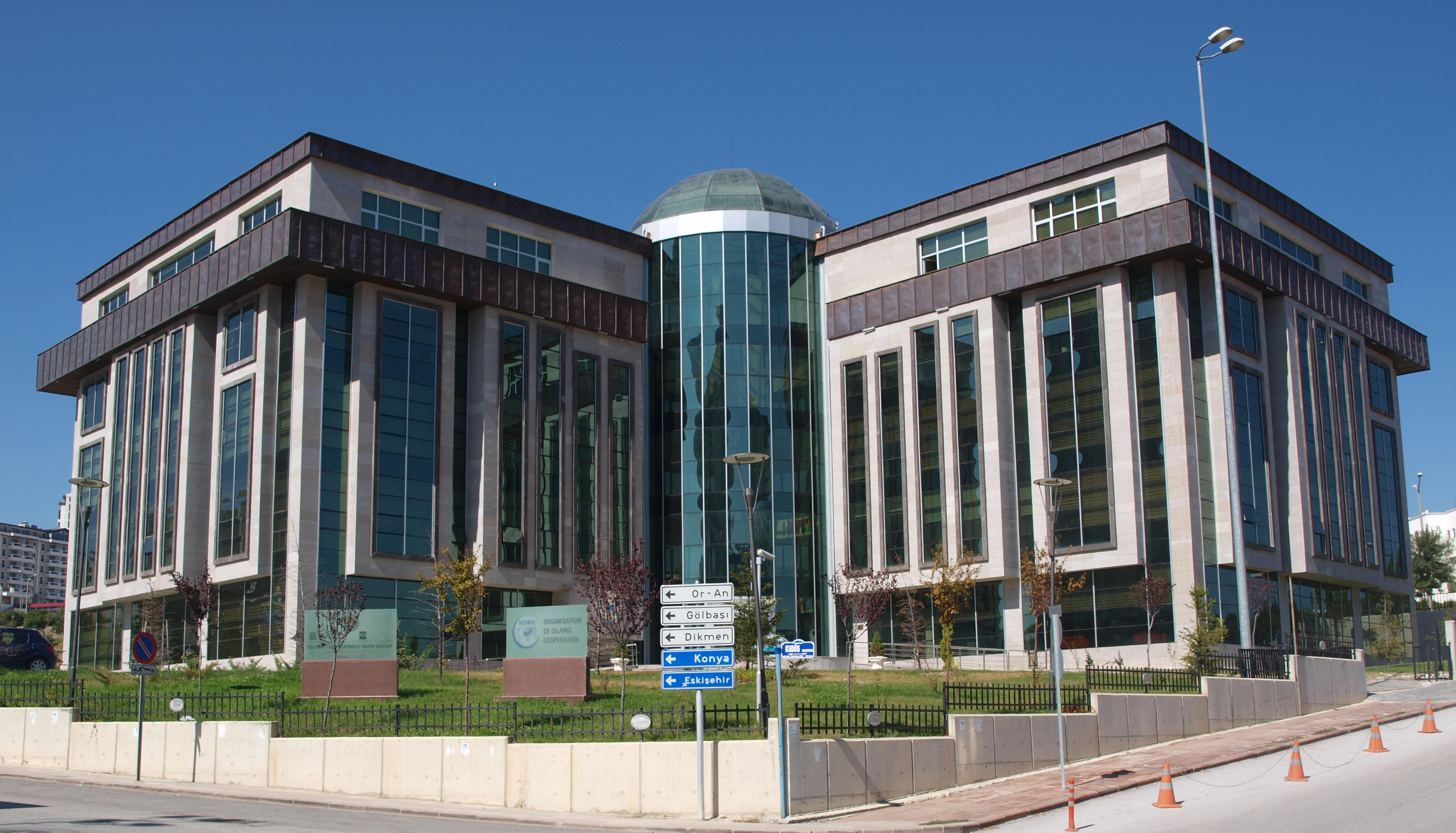

== Selected publications ==
- "Strategic roadmap for development of Islamic tourism in OIC countries". 2017.
