= Islamic Summit of the Organisation of Islamic Cooperation =

Principal organ of the Organisation of Islamic Cooperation

- Arabic: القمة الإسلامية لمنظمة التعاون الإسلامي; French: Sommet islamique de l'Organisation de la coopération islamique
- Flag of the OIC
- Nickname: Islamic Summit
- Formation: 1969; 57 years ago
- Founded at: Rabat, Morocco
- Type: Principal organ
- Legal status: Declaration
- Purpose: Policymaking
- Headquarters: Jeddah
- Location: Saudi Arabia
- Methods: Conference
- Members: 57 member states
- Official language: Arabic, English, French
- Chief administrative officer: Secretary general Hissein Brahim Taha
- Main organ: Organisation of Islamic Cooperation
- Subsidiaries: Standing Committees; Executive Committee; International Islamic Court of Justice
- Website: www.oic-oci.org

Islamic Summit of the Organisation of Islamic Cooperation (Arabic: القمة الإسلامية لمنظمة التعاون الإسلامي; French: Sommet islamique de l'Organisation de la coopération islamique) is one of the five highest decision-making bodies of the OIC, the other four being the OIC Council of Foreign Ministers, Standing Committees, Executive Committee, and the International Islamic Court of Justice. The Islamic Summit is a principle organ of the OIC, focused on formulation, development, and implementation of decisions made by 57 member states. The Summit is attended by the concerned heads of state such as prime ministers, presidents, emirs, and other equivalent heads.

The Summit is held once every three years, incorporated with achieving goals under the framework of the OIC's charter. They formulate policies and adopt resolutions at the end of each summit. Likewise, the OIC Council of Foreign Ministers sessions, an Islamic summit, is alternatively hosted by the concerned governments on geographical groups such as Arab, Asia, and Africa. As of 2022, a total number of 14 Islamic Summits and 7 Extraordinary Summits have been hosted in various countries across the three continents.

== Voting ==
Likewise, the United Nations General Assembly have each Islamic summit participant table have their resolution on a specific matter which is decidedly adopted or declined by the member states under the voting system. Summits are considered declaration based on the common feeling of participants. The Secretary General of the Organisation of Islamic Cooperation plays a significant role in declaration implementation.

== Role of Turkey ==
Turkey represents the OIC as a host and permanent member and has hosted one Islamic summit and two extraordinary summits, including 13th Islamic summit between 14 and 15 April 2016 titled Unity and Solidarity for Justice concerning the Israeli–Palestinian conflict. Turkey has also hosted 6th on 13 December 2017 and 7th extraordinary summit on 18 May 2018 regarding the Israeli role in Palestine.

== List of Summits ==
Islamic summit is based on three principles:.Final Communique, Resolution, and Declaration.and is held once every “four” to “five” years term. The first summit was attended by the nations in September 1969 in Rabat; Morocco and Algeria while the latest was held in Banjul; Gambia and Senegal in May 2024.

Summit	Date	Country	Location	Members	Ref(s)
1st	September 1969	Morocco	Rabat	24	
2nd	22–24 February 1974	Pakistan	Lahore	36	
3rd	25–28 January 1981	Saudi Arabia	Mecca	38	
4th	16–19 January 1984	Morocco	Casablanca	42	
5th	26–29 January 1987	Kuwait	Kuwait	44	
6th	9–11 December 1991	Senegal	Dakar	45	
7th	13–15 December 1994	Morocco	Casablanca	49	
8th	9–11 December 1997	Iran	Tehran	53	
9th	12–13 November 2000	Qatar	Doha	54	
10th	16–17 October 2003	Malaysia	Putrajaya		
11th	13–14 March 2008	Senegal	Dakar		
12th	6–7 February 2013	Egypt	Cairo	56	
13th	14–15 April 2016	Turkey	Istanbul		
14th	31 May 2019	Saudi Arabia	Mecca		
15th	4–5 May 2024	Gambia	Banjul	57	

.::.
