= COMCEC =

Standing committee of the Organisation of Islamic Cooperation

The Standing Committee for Economic and Commercial Cooperation (COMCEC) is one of four standing committees of the Organisation of Islamic Cooperation (OIC). It was established in 1981 at the Third Islamic Summit Conference held in Mecca/Ta'if and serves as a multilateral economic and commercial cooperation forum in the Islamic world. The committee convenes annually at ministerial level in Istanbul under the Chairmanship of the President of the Republic of Turkey.

The organization defines its scope of cooperation by trade, transport, agriculture, tourism, poverty alleviation, and financial as well as private sector cooperation.

== Objectives ==
The COMCEC lists following objectives on its website:

- To address the economic challenges of the Islamic Ummah and to contribute to the development efforts of the Member States.
- To produce and disseminate knowledge, share experience and best-practices, develop a common understanding, and approximate policies among the Member States in line with the vision and principles of its Strategy.
- To serve as the central forum for the Member States to discuss international economic and commercial issues.
- To study all possible means of strengthening economic and commercial cooperation among the Member States.
- To draw up programs and submit proposals designed to increase the welfare of the Member States.
- To ensure the overall coordination of the activities of the OIC relating to economic and commercial cooperation among the Member States.

== History ==
- November 14–16, 1984: First session of the COMCEC in Istanbul
- September 4–7, 1988: At the fourth session of the COMCEC in Istanbul, the states adopted basic guiding principles to set up a trade preferential system among OIC Member States (Declaration of Intent).
- October 7–10, 1990: At its sixth summit, COMCEC is presented a draft framework agreement on the Trade Preferential System which will be adopted afterwards.

== Membership ==
=== Member states ===
- Egypt (Joining date: 1969)
- Libya (Joining date: 1969)
- Indonesia (Joining date: 1969)
- Togo (Joining date: 1997)
- Burkina Faso (Joining date: 1974)
- Malaysia (Joining date: 1969)
- Iraq (Joining date: 1975)
- Tunisia (Joining date: 1969)
- Guyana (Joining date: 1998)
- Algeria (Joining date: 1969)
- Kazakhstan (Joining date: 1995)
- Turkey (Joining date: 1969)
- Somalia (Joining date: 1969)
- Bangladesh (Joining date: 1974)
- Lebanon (Joining date: 1969)
- Turkmenistan (Joining date: 1992)
- Nigeria (Joining date: 1986)
- Albania (Joining date: 1992)
- Maldives (Joining date: 1976)
- Uganda (Joining date: 1974)
- Jordan (Joining date: 1969 )
- Azerbaijan (Joining date: 1992)
- Mali (Joining date: 1969)
- Uzbekistan (Joining date: 1996)
- Iran (Joining date: 1969)
- Benin (Joining date: 1983)
- Mozambique (Joining date: 1994)
- Yemen (Joining date: 1969)
- Mauritania (Joining date: 1969)
- Cameroon (Joining date: 1974)
- Niger (Joining date: 1969)
- Qatar (Joining date: 1972)
- Pakistan (Joining date: 1969)
- Chad (Joining date: 1969)
- Senegal (Joining date: 1969)
- Brunei
- Afghanistan (Joining date: 1969)
- Ivory Coast (Joining date: 2001)
- Sierra Leone (Joining date: 1972)
- Oman (Joining date: 1972)
- Bahrain (Joining date: 1972)
- Djibouti (Joining date: 1978)
- Tajikistan (Joining date: 1992)
- Kuwait (Joining date: 1969)
- Morocco (Joining date: 1969)
- Gabon (Joining date: 1974)
- Gambia (Joining date: 1974)
- Palestine (Joining date: 1969)
- Saudi Arabia (Joining date: 1969)
- Guinea (Joining date: 1969)
- Sudan (Joining date: 1969)
- United Arab Emirates (Joining date: 1972)
- Kyrgyzstan (Joining date: 1992)
- Guinea-Bissau (Joining date: 1974)
- Suriname (Joining date: 1996)
- Comoros (Joining date: 1976)

=== Observers ===
- Bosnia and Herzegovina
- Thailand
- Russia
- Central African Republic
- Northern Cyprus

== The Trade Preferential System (TPS-OIC) ==
The Trade Preferential System aims to promote trade among the Member States of the OIC by means of exchanging preferences. It includes a Most-Favored Nation clause, providing that all states participating in the TPS-OIC receive equal trade advantages as the "most favoured nation" by the country granting such treatment.

=== Trade among OIC countries ===
The official website indicates a goal of 20% intra-OIC trade by the year 2015. However, some economists consider this goal to be unrealistic.

Year	intra-OIC trade (as % of total trade)
2009	16,7%
2010	17,0%
2011	17,8%
2012	N.A.
2013	18,2%

=== Legal documents ===
- TPS-OIC Framework Agreement (entry into force: 2002)
- Protocol on Preferential Tariff Scheme (PRETAS) (entry into force: February 2010)
- TPS-OIC Rules of Origin (entry into force: August 2011)
- Rules of procedures of the Committee
