= Secretary-General of the Organisation of Islamic Cooperation =

Chief administrative officer; head of the OIC Secretariat

The secretary general of the Organisation of Islamic Cooperation (Arabic: أمين عام منظمة التعاون الإسلامي; French: Secrétaire général de l'Organisation de la coopération islamique), is the chief administrative officer of the Organisation of Islamic Cooperation (OIC) and the head of the General Secretariat and other organs of the OIC. A secretary general is elected by the recommendation of the OIC Council of Foreign Ministers from the 57 member states for a renewable term of five years.

It is the main post within the OIC elected under the maxims of equity and its principals. OIC's secretary general is the second highest intergovernmental organization head after the Secretary-General of the United Nations while the undersecretary general is the second highest position within the framework of the OIC's decision implementation. Any member state is entitled to be eligible for the post with rotation between the three geographical regions of the organization (Africa, Arab, and Asia) and equal opportunity, integrity and experience.

== Powers and duties ==
The role of a general secretary is described by the principles of the OIC guidelines. It determines the role of entire organisation within the scope of the OIC guidelines.

A Secretary general brings matters to the attention of the relevant organs of the organisation as per its own opinions within the framework of the organisation. It may serve or adversely affect the objectives of the organization. It implements final decision and resolutions made or recommended by the Council of Foreign or the Ministers and Islamic summits associated with the organisation.

Once a decision is implemented, it provides papers and memorandum to member states for the implementation of decisions, recommendations and resolutions. A secretary general coordinates with the other organs of the OIC for better understanding and collaboration, in addition to exchange important decisions pertaining to the member states. It submit annual report of the OIC concerning organisational activities to the member states.

Tunku Abdul Rahman was the first secretary general of the OIC who assumed the office in 1971 until 1973.

== List of secretaries-general ==
Secretaries-general of the Organisation of Islamic Cooperation
No.	Image	Name	Country of origin	Took office	Left office
1		Tunku Abdul Rahman	Malaysia	1971	1973
2		Hassan Tuhami	Egypt	1974	1975
3		Amadou Karim Gaye	Senegal	1975	1979
4		Habib Chatty	Tunisia	1979	1984
5		Syed Sharifuddin Pirzada	Pakistan	1985	1988
6		Hamid Algabid	Niger	1989	1996
7		Azzeddine Laraki	Morocco	1997	2000
8		Abdelouahed Belkeziz	Morocco	2001	31 December 2004
9		Ekmeleddin İhsanoğlu	Turkey	31 December 2004	31 January 2014
10		Iyad bin Amin Madani	Saudi Arabia	31 January 2014	1 November 2016
11		Yousef Al-Othaimeen	Saudi Arabia	1 November 2016	29 November 2020
12		Hissein Brahim Taha	Chad	29 November 2020	27 August 2026
13		Ismail Ould Cheikh Ahmed	Mauritania	27 August 2026	Present

== See also ==
- Secretary-General of the United Nations
- Secretary General of NATO
- Secretary General of the Organization of American States
