= Organisation of Islamic Cooperation =

International organisation

Organisation of Islamic Cooperation منظمة التعاون الإسلامي (Arabic) Organisation de la coopération islamique (French)
- Flag Coat of arms
- Motto: "To safeguard the interests and ensure the progress and well-being of Muslims"
- Member states Observer states
- Administrative centre (Headquarters): Jeddah, Saudi Arabia
- Official languages: Arabic; English; French
- Type: Intergovernmental organisation
- Membership: 57 member states

Leaders
  - Secretary General: Ismail Ould Cheikh Ahmed

Establishment
  - Charter signed: 25 September 1969; 57 years ago

Population
  - 2018 estimate: 1.81 billion
- GDP (PPP): 2019 estimate
  - Total: $27.949 trillion
  - Per capita: $19,451
- GDP (nominal): 2019 estimate
  - Total: $9.904 trillion
  - Per capita: $9,361
- HDI (2023): ▲0.702 high
- Website oic-oci.org

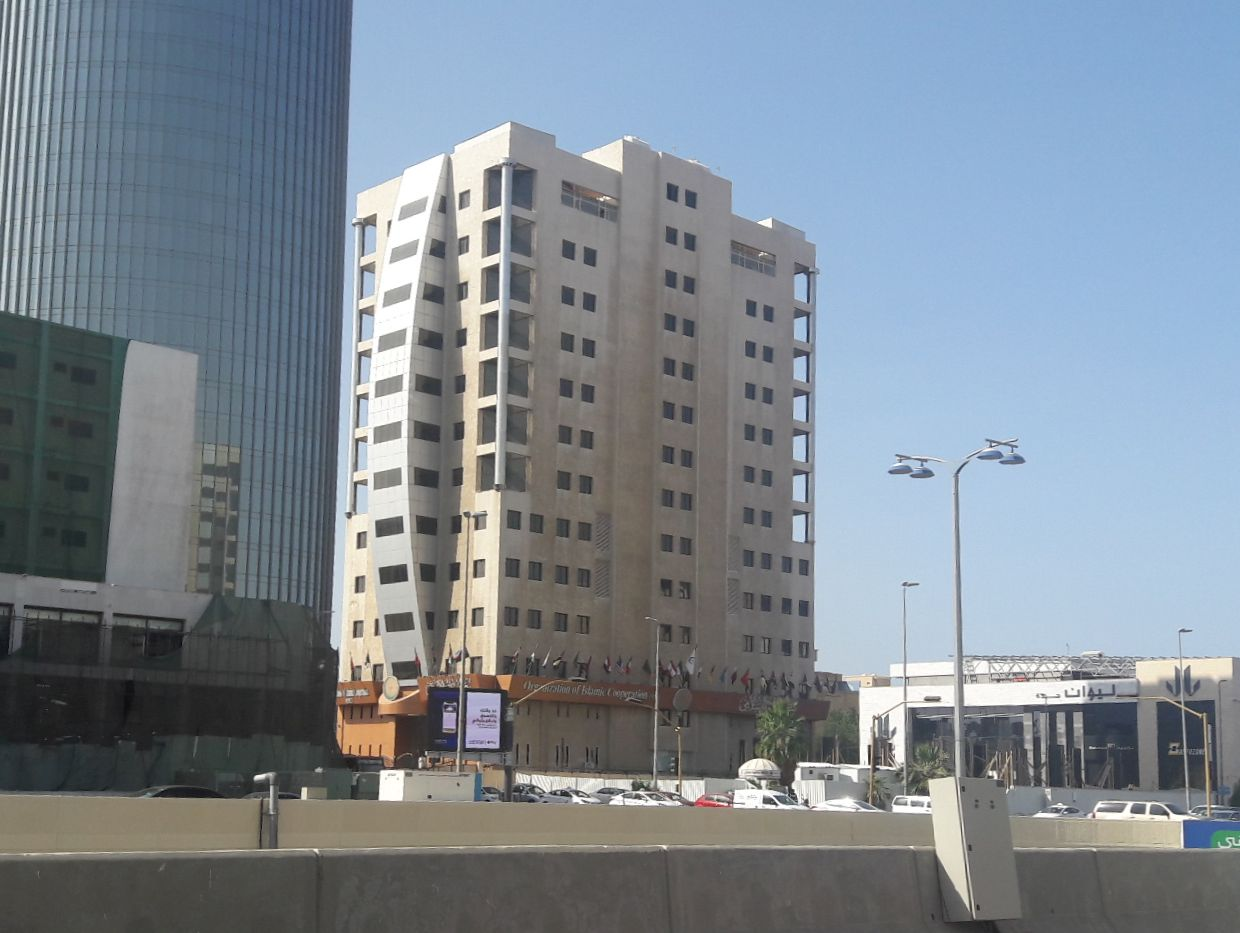
Organisation of Islamic Cooperation Head-office Building, Jeddah

The Organisation of Islamic Cooperation (OIC; Arabic: منظمة التعاون الإسلامي, romanised: Munaẓẓamat at-Taʿāwun al-ʾIslāmī; French: Organisation de la coopération islamique), formerly the Organisation of the Islamic Conference, is an intergovernmental organisation founded in 1969. It consists of 57 member states, 48 of which are Muslim-majority. The organisation claims to be "the collective voice of the Muslim world" and works to "safeguard and protect the interests of the Muslim world in the spirit of promoting international peace and harmony".

OIC has permanent delegations to the United Nations and the European Union. Its official languages are Arabic, English, and French. It operates affiliated, specialised, and subsidiary organs within the framework of OIC Charter.

Member states had a collective population of over 1.8 billion as of 2015, accounting for just under a quarter of the world's population. The collective area is 31.66 m km^{2}.

== History ==
On 21 August 1969, after the Al-Aqsa mosque fire in Jerusalem, Amin al-Husseini, the former Mufti of Jerusalem, called for a summit of all Muslim heads of state. The fire destroyed part of the old wooden roof and an 800-year-old pulpit. The arsonist was an Australian Christian fundamentalist Denis Michael Rohan. On 25 September 1969, representatives of 24 Muslim majority countries met in Rabat, Morocco. A resolution was passed stating that Muslim governments would henceforth strive for close cooperation and mutual assistance in economic, scientific, cultural and religious endeavors.

In March 1970, the First Islamic Conference of Foreign Ministers was held in Jeddah, Saudi Arabia. In 1972, the Organisation of the Islamic Conference was founded.

While the al-Aqsa fire is regarded as one of the catalysts, many Muslims aspired to a pan-Islamic institution that would serve the common political, economic, and social interests of the ummah (Muslim community) beginning in the 19th century. In particular, the collapse of the Ottoman Empire and the Caliphate after World War I left a vacuum.

According to its charter, the OIC aims to preserve Islamic social and economic values; promote solidarity amongst member states; increase cooperation in social, economic, cultural, scientific, and political areas; uphold international peace and security; and advance education, particularly in science and technology.

The OIC emblem contains three main elements that reflect its vision and mission as incorporated in its Charter: the Kaaba, the Globe, and the Crescent.

On 5 August 1990, 45 foreign ministers of the OIC adopted the Cairo Declaration on Human Rights in Islam to provide guidance in matters of human rights in as much as they are compatible with Sharia (Quranic Law).

The Parliamentary Union of the OIC Member States (PUOICM) was established in Iran in 1999, and its head office is situated in Tehran. Only OIC members are entitled to membership in the union.

In March 2008, the OIC revised its charter to promote human rights, fundamental freedoms, and good governance in member states. The revisions removed any mention of the Cairo Declaration. Within the revised charter, the OIC supported the Charter of the United Nations and international law, without mentioning the Universal Declaration of Human Rights.

On 28 June 2011, during the 38th Council of Foreign Ministers meeting (CFM) in Astana, Kazakhstan, the organisation changed its name from Organisation of the Islamic Conference (Arabic: منظمة المؤتمر الإسلامي; French: Organisation de la Conférence Islamique) to its current name. The OIC also changed its logo at this time.

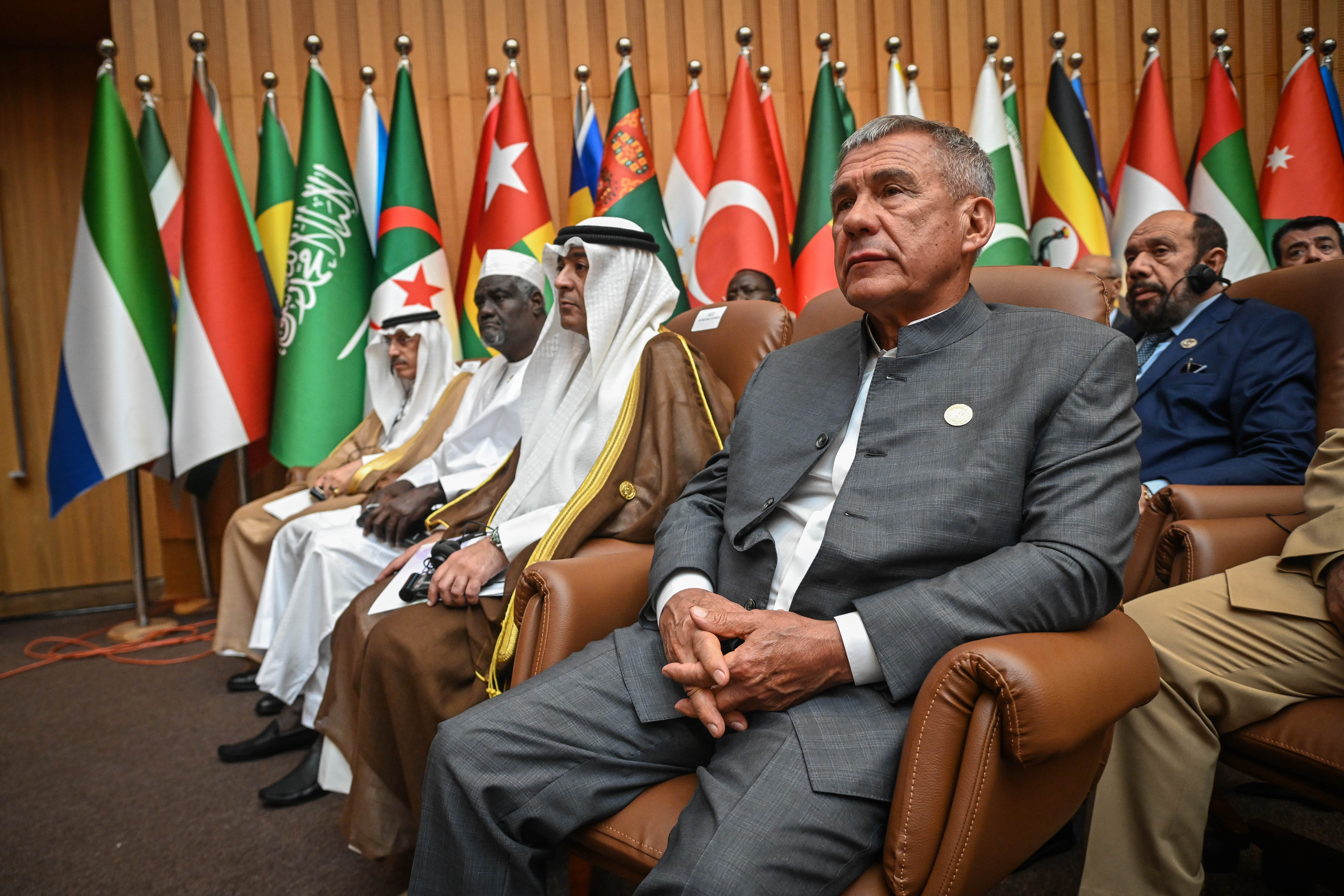
Head of Tatarstan Rustam Minnikhanov at the 15th OIC Summit in Gambia on 4 May 2024

According to the UNHCR, OIC countries hosted 18 million refugees by the end of 2010. OIC members continued to absorb refugees from other conflicts, including 2011 uprising in Syria. In May 2012, the OIC addressed these concerns at the "Refugees in the Muslim World" conference in Ashgabat, Turkmenistan.

On 27 June 2007, then-United States President George W. Bush announced that the United States would delegate an envoy to the OIC. Bush said of the envoy, "Our special envoy will listen to and learn from representatives from Muslim states, and will share with them America's views and values." As of June 2015, Arsalan Suleman is acting special envoy. He was appointed on 13 February 2015. In an investigation of the accuracy of a series of chain emails, Snopes.com reported that during the October 2003 – April 2004 session of the General Assembly, 17 individual members of the OIC voted against the United States 88% of the time.

== Members ==
A clickable Euler diagram showing the relationships between various multinational organisations within the Organisation of Islamic Cooperation

The Organisation of Islamic Cooperation has 57 members, 56 of which are also member states of the United Nations. The exception is Palestine. Some member countries-Ivory Coast, Guyana, Gabon, Mozambique, Nigeria, Suriname, Togo and Uganda are not Muslim-majority. Bosnia and Herzegovina, the Central African Republic, Thailand, Russia, and Northern Cyprus (under the name "Turkish Cypriot State") are observer states, and other organisations and groups participate as observers. Syria’s OIC membership was suspended on 14–15 August 2012, because of the government’s use of heavy weapons against civilians and its refusal to engage in peaceful dialogue. On 7 March 2025, Syria officially restored a full membership after the fall of the Assad regime.

=== Africa ===
- Algeria
- Benin
- Burkina Faso
- Cameroon
- Chad
- Comoros
- Djibouti
- Egypt
- Gabon
- Gambia
- Guinea
- Guinea-Bissau
- Ivory Coast
- Libya
- Mali
- Mauritania
- Morocco
- Mozambique
- Niger
- Nigeria
- Senegal
- Sierra Leone
- Somalia
- Sudan
- Togo
- Tunisia
- Uganda

=== Asia ===
- /Afghanistan
- Azerbaijan
- Bahrain
- Bangladesh
- Brunei
- Indonesia
- Iran
- Iraq
- Jordan
- Kazakhstan
- Kuwait
- Kyrgyzstan
- Lebanon
- Malaysia
- Maldives
- Oman
- Pakistan
- Palestine
- Qatar
- Saudi Arabia
- Syria
- Tajikistan
- Turkey
- Turkmenistan
- United Arab Emirates
- Uzbekistan
- Yemen

=== Europe ===
- Albania

=== Americas ===
- Guyana
- Suriname

== Positions ==
=== Fitna ===
The OIC, on 28 March 2008, joined the criticism of the film Fitna by Dutch lawmaker Geert Wilders, which features disturbing images of violent acts juxtaposed with alleged verses from the Quran.

=== Houthis ===
In March 2015, the OIC announced its support for the Saudi Arabian-led intervention in Yemen against the Zaydi Houthis.

=== Israeli–Palestinian conflict ===
The OIC supports a two-state solution to the Israeli–Palestinian conflict.

The OIC calls for a boycott of Israeli products in an effort to pressure Israel into ending the occupation of the Palestinian territories.

At a 2013 meeting in Conakry, Guinea, Secretary-General Ekmeleddin Ihsanoglu said that foreign ministers would discuss the possibility of cutting ties with any state that recognised Jerusalem as the capital of Israel or that moves its embassy to its environs.

At a December 2017 extraordinary meeting held in response US President Donald Trump's decision to recognise Jerusalem, the "Istanbul Declaration on Freedom for Al Quds". was adopted.

In September 2019, the OIC condemned Israeli Prime Minister Benjamin Netanyahu's plans to annex the eastern portion of the occupied West Bank known as the Jordan Valley. In January 2024, the OIC expressed support for South Africa's ICJ genocide case against Israel.

=== India ===
Islam is the second-largest religion in India after Hinduism. Over 200 million Muslims constitute approximately 15% of the country's population. India has the largest Muslim population other than Muslim-majority or Islamic states. However, India's relationship with Pakistan (an Islamic state), has featured hostilities and armed conflict since the 1947 Partition of India. The poor relationship between them impacted India–OIC relations due to Pakistan's status as a founding member. India pushed for the OIC to accept it as a member state, arguing that Indian Muslims comprise 11% of the world's Muslim population; Pakistan has staunchly opposed this.

Pakistan cites its conflict with India over the Kashmir region as its rationale. It frequently accuses India of perpetrating human rights abuses against Kashmiris in the Indian-administered territory of Jammu and Kashmir. The region has experienced an ongoing militant uprising since the 1980s. The OIC has been urged to press India on the Kashmir dispute, and has faced pushback from Indian officials for occasional references to Jammu and Kashmir. Historically, the Muslim world has largely lent its support to Pakistan on the issue.

The first OIC summit held in 1969 in Rabat did not address the dispute, while granting India membership was discussed. The head of the Indian delegation addressed the summit. The erstwhile President of Pakistan, Yahya Khan, reportedly expressed mixed views. The Indian delegation, led by then Indian President Fakhruddin Ali Ahmad, was scheduled to attend the summit but ultimately was not allowed in due to Pakistan's controversial boycott threat. Differences between the two states led Pakistan to keep India out for the final session of the 1969 conference and all OIC subsequent summits.

==== 2019 Pulwama attack and India–Pakistan standoff ====
On 14 February 2019, a suicide-bombing attack by a Muslim militant in Jammu and Kashmir killed over 40 Indian soldiers, for which responsibility was claimed by Jaish-e-Mohammed, a Pakistan-based terrorist group. In March 2019, India conducted airstrikes in Pakistani territory, which subsequently led to the 2019 India–Pakistan military standoff.

After these events, Indian Foreign Minister Sushma Swaraj was invited to participate in an OIC summit. However, Pakistan protested this development and demanded that India be blocked from the event, accusing the latter of an unprovoked violation of Pakistani airspace while Indian officials claimed that the strike was carried out on terrorist-training camps. Following requests by Pakistan shortly after the 14 February attack, the OIC held an emergency meeting on 26 February. The organisation subsequently condemned India's military response to the attack and advised both sides to exercise restraint.

For the first time in five decades, the United Arab Emirates invited India as a "guest of honour" to attend the inaugural plenary 46th meeting of OIC foreign ministers in Abu Dhabi on 1 and 2 March 2019, overriding protests by Pakistan. In response Pakistan boycotted the meeting. Indian Foreign Minister Swaraj headed the Indian delegation at the summit.

On 18 April 2020, OIC issued a statement, urging the Modi administration of India to take urgent steps to "stop the growing tide of Islamophobia", citing attacks by Hindu nationalists against Indian Muslims and the allegation against Muslims of spreading COVID-19 in the country.

=== Cartoons of Muhammad ===
Cartoons of Muhammad, published in a Danish newspaper in September 2005, offended a number of Muslims. The Third Extraordinary Session of the Islamic Summit Conference in December 2005 condemned publication of the cartoons, resulting in broader coverage of the issue by news media in Muslim countries. Subsequently, violent demonstrations throughout the Islamic world resulted in multiple deaths.

=== Human rights ===
OIC created the Cairo Declaration on Human Rights in Islam. Proponents claim it is not an alternative to the UDHR, but rather complementary to it. Article 24 states that "all the rights and freedoms stipulated in this Declaration are subject to the Islamic Shari'ah" and Article 25 follows with "the Islamic Shari'ah is the only source of reference for the explanation or clarification of any of the articles of this Declaration." Attempts to have it adopted by the United Nations Human Rights Council met criticism, because of its contradiction of the UDHR, including from liberal Muslim groups. Critics of the CDHR state bluntly that it is "manipulation and hypocrisy," "designed to dilute, if not altogether eliminate, civil and political rights protected by international law" and attempts to "circumvent these principles [of freedom and equality]."

Human Rights Watch says that OIC "fought doggedly" and successfully within the United Nations Human Rights Council to shield states from criticism, except criticism of Israel. For example, when independent experts reported violations of human rights in the 2006 Lebanon War, "state after state from the OIC took the floor to denounce the experts for daring to look beyond Israeli violations to discuss Hezbollah's as well. OIC demands that the council "should work cooperatively with abusive governments rather than condemn them." HRW responded that this works with those who are willing to cooperate; others exploit the passivity.

OIC has been criticised for failing to discuss the treatment of ethnic minorities within member countries, such as the oppression of the Kurds in Syria and Turkey, the Ahwaz in Iran, the Hazaras in Afghanistan, the 'Al-Akhdam' in Yemen, or the Berbers in Algeria.

Along with OIC's 2008 charter revisions, the member states created the Independent Permanent Human Rights Commission (IPHRC). The IPHRC is an advisory body, independent from OIC, composed of eighteen individuals from diverse educational and professional backgrounds. IPHRC has the power to monitor human rights within the member states and facilitates the integration of human rights into all OIC mandates. IPHRC also aids in the promotion of political, civil, and economic rights in all member states.

In September 2017, the Independent Human Rights Commission (IPHRC) of the OIC strongly condemned the human rights violations against the Rohingya Muslims in Myanmar.

In December 2018, the OIC tentatively raised the issue of China's Xinjiang re-education camps and human rights abuses against the Uyghurs. The OIC reversed its position after a visit to Xinjiang, and in March 2019, the OIC issued a report on human rights for Muslim minorities that praised China for "providing care to its Muslim citizens" and looked forward to greater cooperation with the PRC. In December 2020 a coalition of American Muslim groups criticised OIC for failing to speak up to prevent the abuse of the Uyghurs and accused member states of being influenced by Chinese power. The groups included the Council on American-Islamic Relations.

==== LGBT rights ====
In March 2012, the United Nations Human Rights Council held its first discussion of discrimination based on sexual orientation and gender identity, following the 2011 passage of a resolution supporting LGBT rights proposed by the Republic of South Africa. Pakistan's representative addressed the session on behalf of the OIC, denouncing the discussion and questioning the concept of sexual orientation, which he said promoted "licentious behaviour ... against the fundamental teachings of various religions, including Islam". He stated that the council should not discuss the topic again. Most Arab countries and some African countries walked out of the session.

Nonetheless, OIC members Albania, Gabon, Guinea-Bissau, Suriname and Sierra Leone signed a 2011 UN declaration supporting LGBT rights in the General Assembly. Bahrain, Jordan and Turkey legalised homosexuality.

In May 2016, 57 countries including Egypt, Iran, Pakistan, Saudi Arabia and the United Arab Emirates from the Organisation of Islamic Cooperation requested the removal of LGBT associations from 2016 High Level Meeting on Ending AIDS, sparking protests by the United States, Canada, the European Union and LGBT communities.

=== Science and technology ===
==== Astana Declaration ====
The Astana Declaration is a policy guidance adopted by OIC members at the Astana Summit. The Astana Declaration commits members to increase investment in science and technology, education, eradicate extreme poverty, and implement UN Sustainable Development Goals.

=== Non-state terrorism ===
In 1999, OIC adopted the OIC Convention on Combatting International Terrorism. Human Rights Watch reported that the definition of terrorism in article 1 describes "any act or threat of violence carried out with the aim of, among other things, imperiling people’s honour, occupying or seizing public or private property, or threatening the stability, territorial integrity, political unity or sovereignty of a state." HRW described this as vague, ill-defined, and including much that is outside the generally accepted concept of terrorism. In HRW's view, it labels, or could easily be used to label, as terrorist actions, acts of peaceful expression, association, and assembly.

Legal scholar Ben Saul argued that the definition is subjective and ambiguous and concluded that it left a "serious danger of the abusive use of terrorist prosecutions against political opponents" and others.

HRW is concerned by OIC's apparent unwillingness to recognise as terrorism acts that serve causes endorsed by their member states. Article 2 reads: "Peoples' struggle including armed struggle against foreign occupation, aggression, colonialism, and hegemony, aimed at liberation and self-determination." HRW suggested that OIC embrace "longstanding and universally recognised international human rights standards", a request that has not led to any results.

During a meeting in Malaysia in April 2002, delegates discussed terrorism but failed to reach a definition of it. They rejected, however, any description of the Palestinian fight with Israel as terrorism. Their declaration was explicit: "We reject any attempt to link terrorism to the struggle of the Palestinian people in the exercise of their inalienable right to establish their independent state with Al-Quds Al-Shrif (Jerusalem) as its capital." In fact, at the outset of the meeting, the OIC countries signed a statement praising the Palestinians and their "blessed intifada." The word terrorism was restricted to describe Israel, whom they condemned for "state terrorism" in their war with the Palestinian people.

At the 34th Islamic Conference of Foreign Ministers (ICFM), an OIC section, in May 2007, the foreign ministers termed Islamophobia "the worst form of terrorism".

=== Dispute with Thailand ===
Thailand responded to OIC criticism of human rights abuses in the Muslim majority provinces of Pattani, Yala, and Narathiwat in the south of the country. In a statement issued on 18 October 2005, secretary-general Ekmeleddin İhsanoğlu vocalised concern over the continuing conflict in the south that "claimed the lives of innocent people and forced the migration of local people out of their places". He stressed that the Thai government's security approach to the crisis would aggravate the situation and lead to continued violence.

On 18–19 April 2009, exiled Patani leader Abu Yasir Fikri was invited to the OIC to speak about the conflict and present a proposal to end the violence between the Thai government and the ethnically Malay Muslims living in the neglected south. The group has been struggling against Thai assimilation policy and for self governance since the area was annexed by Thailand in 1902. Fikri presented a six-point solution at the conference that included obtaining the same basic rights as other groups when it came to rights of language, religion, and culture. He suggested that Thailand give up its discriminatory policies against the Patani people and allow Patani to at least be allowed the same self-governing rights as other regions in Thailand, citing that this does not go against the Thai constitution since it had been done in other parts of Thailand. He criticised the Thai government's escalation of violence by arming and creating Buddhist militia groups and questioned their intentions. He added that Thai policies of not investigating corruption, murder, and human rights violations perpetrated by Bangkok-led administration and military personnel was an obstacle for achieving peace and healing the deep wounds of "third-class" citizens.

Thai foreign minister Kantathi Suphamongkhon said in response: "We have made it clear to the OIC several times that the violence in the deep South is not caused by religious conflict and the government grants protection to all of our citizens no matter what religion they embrace." The Foreign Ministry issued a statement dismissing the OIC's criticism and accusing it of disseminating misperceptions and misinformation about the situation in the southern provinces. "If the OIC secretariat really wants to promote the cause of peace and harmony in the three southern provinces of Thailand, the responsibility falls on the OIC secretariat to strongly condemn the militants, who are perpetrating these acts of violence against both Thai Muslims and Thai Buddhists." HRW and Amnesty International offsered the same concerns as OIC, rebuffing Thailand's attempts to dismiss the issue.

== Notable meetings ==
Various OIC meetings have attracted global attention.

=== Ninth meeting of PUOICM ===
The ninth meeting of Parliamentary Union of the OIC member states (PUOICM) was held on 15 and 16 February 2007 in Kuala Lumpur, Malaysia. The speaker of Malaysia's House of Representatives, Ramli bin Ngah Talib, spoke at the inaugural ceremony. One main agenda item was stopping Israel from continuing its excavation at the Western Wall of the Temple Mount / Masjid Al-Aqsa, Islam's third holiest site. OIC also discussed how it might send peacekeeping troops to Muslim states, as well as the possibility of a name change and charter changes. Return of the sovereignty right to the Iraqi people along with withdrawal of foreign troops from Iraq was another one of the main agenda items.

Pakistani Foreign Minister Khurshid Mahmud Kasuri stated on 14 February that the secretary general of OIC and foreign ministers of seven "like-minded Muslim countries" would meet in Islamabad on 25 February following meetings of President Musharraf with the heads of Muslim countries to discuss "a new initiative" for the resolution of the Israeli–Palestinian conflict.

=== IPHRC trip to Washington, DC ===
In December 2012, IPHRC met in Washington, D.C. for the first time. The IPHRC held meetings at the National Press Club, Capitol Hill, and Freedom House discussing the issues of human rights in the OIC member states. During their roundtable discussion with Freedom House, the IPHRC emphasised the adoption of the Universal Declaration of Human Rights and the rejection of the Cairo Declaration by the OIC.

=== Observer status dispute ===
The September 2014's high-level Summit of the OIC, in New York, ended without adopting any resolutions or conclusions, for the first time in several years, due to a dispute regarding the status of one of its Observer states. Egypt, Iran and the United Arab Emirates demanded that the OIC remove the term 'Turkish Cypriot State' in reference to the unrecognised Turkish Republic of Northern Cyprus (TRNC), which had observer status within the organisation. Egypt's president Abdel Fattah el-Sisi insisted that any reference to the "Turkish Republic of Northern Cyprus or Turkish Cypriot State" was unacceptable and was ultimately the reason for the OIC not adopting any resolutions or conclusions in the 2014 summit.

=== Emergency meetings on Hamas-Israeli war ===
On November 11, 2023 the group and the Arab League met in Riyadh for a special summit on the Gaza humanitarian situation created by the Gaza war.

On 5 August 2024 Iran called for an emergency meeting of the OIC on 7 August because it wanted to drum up support for its war against Israel in the wake of the Tehran assassination of Hamas leader Ismail Haniyeh. Jeddah, Saudi Arabia hosted the meeting, and Iran's foreign minister Ali Bagheri said Ayatollah Khomeini has no other choice but to use his right to self-defense. Other participants raised concerns about a wider regional conflict and Bagheri's motion failed to carry.

== Structure and organisation ==
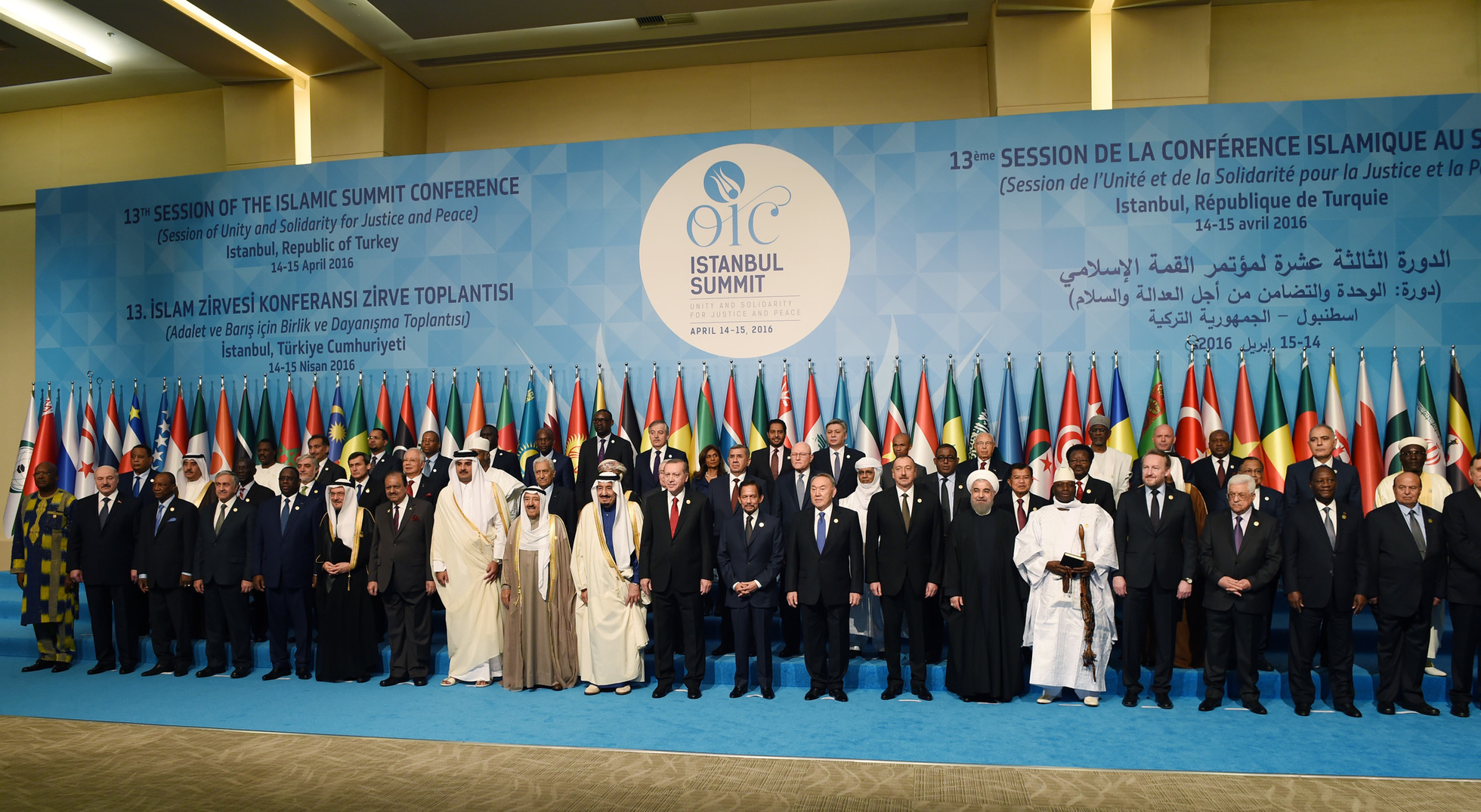
Session of the Islamic Summit Conference in Istanbul, Turkey, April 2016

The OIC is headquartered in Jeddah, Saudi Arabia with regional offices in New York, Geneva, Brussels, Iraq, Kabul, and Indonesia.

The OIC system consists of:

=== Islamic Summit ===
The largest meeting, attended by the heads of state and government of the member states, convenes every three years. The Islamic Summit takes policy decisions and provide guidance on all issues pertaining to the realisation of the objectives as provided in the Charter and consider other issues of concern to the Member States and the Ummah.

=== Islamic Conference of Foreign Ministers ===
Islamic Conference of Foreign Ministers meets once a year to examine a progress report on the implementation of its decisions taken within the framework of the policy defined by the Islamic Summit.

=== Universities ===
The OIC sponsors four universities: the Islamic University of Technology, a subsidiary organ; and three affiliated institutions; the Islamic University in Uganda; the Islamic University of Niger; and the International Islamic University Malaysia.

=== Secretary General ===
The Secretary General is elected by the Council of Foreign Ministers for a term of five years, with a maximum of two terms. The Secretary-General is elected from among nationals of the Member States in accordance with the principles of equitable geographical distribution, rotation and equal opportunity for all Member States with due consideration to competence, integrity and experience.

=== Permanent Secretariat ===
The Permanent Secretariat is the executive organ of the Organisation, entrusted with the implementation of the decisions of the two preceding bodies, and is located in Jeddah, Saudi Arabia.

=== Subsidiary organisations ===
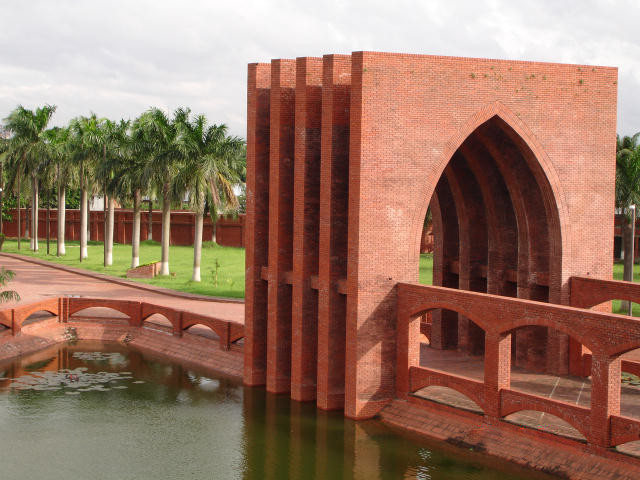
The Islamic University of Technology was set up by the OIC in Bangladesh

- The Statistical, Economic and Social Research and Training Centre for Islamic Countries, in Ankara, Turkey
- The Research Centre for Islamic History, Art and Culture (IRCICA), located in Istanbul, Turkey
- The Islamic University of Technology, located in Dhaka, Bangladesh
- The Islamic Centre for Development of Trade, located in Casablanca, Morocco
- The Islamic Fiqh Academy, located in Jeddah, Saudi Arabia
- The Islamsate Islamic Network, located at Riyadh, Saudi Arabia
- The Executive Bureau of the Islamic Solidarity Fund and its Waqf, located in Jeddah, Saudi Arabia
- The Islamic University in Niger, located in Say, Niger.
- The Islamic University in Uganda, located in Mbale, Uganda.
- The Tabriz Islamic Arts University, located in Tabriz, Iran.

=== Specialised institutions ===
- The Islamic Educational, Scientific and Cultural Organisation (ISESCO), located in Rabat, Morocco.
- The Islamic States Broadcasting Organisation (ISBO) and the International Islamic News Agency (IINA), located in Jeddah, Saudi Arabia

=== Affiliated institutions ===
- Islamabad Chamber of Commerce & Industry (ICCI), located in Karachi, Pakistan.
- World Islamic Economic Forum (WIEF), located in Kuala Lumpur, Malaysia.
- Organisation of Islamic Capitals and Cities (OICC), located in Jeddah, Saudi Arabia.
- Sports Federation of Islamic Solidarity Games, located in Riyadh, Saudi Arabia.
- Islamic Committee of the International Crescent (ICIC), located in Benghazi, Libya.
- Islamic Shipowners Association (ISA), located in Jeddah, Saudi Arabia.
- World Federation of International Arab-Islamic Schools, located in Jeddah, Saudi Arabia.
- International Association of Islamic Banks (IAIB), located in Jeddah, Saudi Arabia.
- Islamic Conference Youth Forum for Dialogue and Cooperation (ICYF-DC), located in Istanbul, Turkey.
- General Council for Islamic Banks and Financial Institutions (CIBAFI), located in Manama, Bahrain.
- Standards and Metrology Institute for Islamic Countries (SMIIC), located in Istanbul, Turkey.

== Criticism ==
OIC has been criticised by many Muslims for its lack of engagement and solutions for Muslim countries in crisis. It is said to have made progress in social and academic terms but not politically.

In 2020, Pakistan's Minister of Foreign Affairs SM Qureshi criticised OIC for its stand with regard to Kashmir issue.

The Organisation of Islamic Cooperation has been criticised for advocating for limitations to the freedom of speech and freedom of religion by interpreting apostasy and heresy as anti-Islamic speech and Islamophobia.

== List of summits ==
Number	Date	Country	Place
1st	22–25 September 1969	Morocco	Rabat
2nd	22–24 February 1974	Pakistan	Lahore
3rd	25–29 January 1981	Saudi Arabia	Mecca & Ta’if
4th	16–19 January 1984	Morocco	Casablanca
5th	26–29 January 1987	Kuwait	Kuwait City
6th	9–11 December 1991	Senegal	Dakar
7th	13–15 December 1994	Morocco	Casablanca
1st Extraordinary	23–24 March 1997	Pakistan	Islamabad
8th	9–11 December 1997	Iran	Tehran
9th	12–13 November 2000	Qatar	Doha
2nd Extraordinary	4–5 March 2003	Qatar	Doha
10th	16–17 October 2003	Malaysia	Putrajaya
3rd Extraordinary	7–8 December 2005	Saudi Arabia	Mecca
11th	13–14 March 2008	Senegal	Dakar
4th Extraordinary	14–15 August 2012	Saudi Arabia	Mecca
12th	6–7 February 2013	Egypt	Cairo
5th Extraordinary	6–7 March 2016	Indonesia	Jakarta
13th	14–15 April 2016	Turkey	Istanbul
6th Extraordinary	13 December 2017	Turkey	Istanbul
7th Extraordinary	18 May 2018	Turkey	Istanbul
14th	31 May 2019	Saudi Arabia	Mecca
8th Extraordinary	19 December 2021	Pakistan	Islamabad
48th session of Council of Foreign Ministers	22 March 2022	Pakistan	Islamabad
9th Extraordinary	18 October 2023	Saudi Arabia	Jeddah
15th	4 May 2024	Gambia	Banjul

== See also ==
- Azerbaijan–OIC relations
- Cairo Declaration on Human Rights in Islam
- D-8 Organization for Economic Cooperation
- Flag of the Organisation of Islamic Cooperation
- Islamic Military Counter Terrorism Coalition
- Islamic Reporting Initiative
- Islamic University of Technology
- List of largest cities in Organisation of Islamic Cooperation member countries
- Demographics of the member states of the Organisation of Islamic Cooperation
- Pakistan and the Organisation of Islamic Cooperation
