= OIC Council of Foreign Ministers =

Decision-making body of the OIC

Council of Foreign Ministers
- Arabic: مجلس وزراء الخارجية; French: Conseil des ministres des affaires étrangères
- Flag of the Organisation of Islamic Cooperation
- Abbreviation: CFM
- Formation: 3 September 1969; 57 years ago
- Founder: Organisation of Islamic Cooperation
- Founded at: Jeddah, Saudi Arabia
- Type: Intergovernmental organization
- Legal status: Governing body
- Purpose: Decision-making
- Location: Jeddah, Saudi Arabia
- Region served: Worldwide
- Method: Public conference, meeting, speech
- Members: 57 member states
- Official language: Arabic, English, French
- Secretary General: Hissein Brahim Taha
- Main organ: Organisation of Islamic Cooperation
- Publication: General Secretariat
- Website: www.oic-oci.org
- Formerly called: Islamic Conference of Foreign Ministers

The Council of Foreign Ministers (CFM Arabic: مجلس وزراء الخارجية; French: Conseil des ministres des affaires étrangères; Turkish: Dışişleri Bakanları Konseyi; DBK), formerly known as Islamic Conference of Foreign Ministers, is the main decision-making body of the Organisation of Islamic Cooperation consisting one representative from each member states of the OIC. It is the largest decision-oriented intergovernmental organization that holds conferences every year called Islamic Summit pertaining to the issues concerning Muslim nations and the OIC's agenda. The 48th summit is scheduled to be held in Islamabad, Pakistan on 22 March 2022.

It hold meetings objectively focused on the implementation of decisions and recommendations within the scope of OIC principles and guidelines. One of its main activities are to approve budget of the General Secretariat and its other departments. It also elect chief executive officer for the post of secretary general. The Republic of Turkey has hosted three Islamic Summits between 1976, which was its first meeting (7th DBK) and the second in 1991 (12th DBK), while the third and the last summit hosted in Turkey was held in 2004 during the 31st DBK.

Beside being a part of council of foreign affairs ministers, it also hosts public conferences called Extraordinary Foreign Ministers Meeting designed to address the human rights violations in the Muslim nations, including in Afghanistan.

== Powers and duties ==
The Council of Foreign Ministers is mandated with the sole authority to take critical decisions regarding the activities and purpose of the OIC. It is also responsible for changing the status of the OIC and its associated members within the scope of the organisational principles. The foreign ministers of the member states, including the host country, Turkey plays a vital role in the OIC. They are entitled to propose any critical change within the guidelines and scope, while are itself implemented by the Council of Foreign Ministers. It also establish trust funds for humanitarian aid in the state of emergencies.

It implements general policies, in addition to adopting decisions and resolutions pertaining to the common interest of the OIC. Once a decision is taken, it reviews progress for its final approval and implementation of decisions and resolutions. The council submits its final result to the General Secretariat for its final approval which is traditionally headed by OIC's general secretary. Affiliated organs specialized in common interest of the general policies also participates in parliamentary procedure which is officially known by the OIC as session or Islamic summit.

== List of sessions ==
The first session was hosted on 3 September 1969 by the Kingdom of Morocco in Rabat, while the last summit was hosted between 22 and 23 March 2022 by the Islamic Republic of Pakistan in Islamabad.

Sessions	Date	Country	Place	Ref(s)
1st	3 September 1969	Morocco	Rabat	
2nd	20 December 1970	Pakistan	Karachi	
3rd	23 March 1972	Saudi Arabia	Jeddah	
4th	24 March 1973	Libya	Benghazi	
5th	24 July 1974	Malaysia	Kuala Lumpur	
6th	12 July 1975	Saudi Arabia	Jeddah	
7th	14 May 1976	Turkey	Istanbul	
8th	16 May 1977	Libya	Tripoli	
9th	4 April 1978	Senegal	Dakar	
10th	8 May 1979	Morocco	-	
11th	3 September 1980	Pakistan	Islamabad	
12th	3 September 1981	Iraq	Baghdad	
13th	22–26 August 1982	Niger	Niamey	
14th	5 December 1983	Bangladesh	Dhaka	
15th	3 September 1984	Yemen	Sana'a	
16th	3 September 1986	Morocco	-	
17th	3 September 1988	Jordan	Amman	
18th	7 December 1989	Saudi Arabia	Riyadh	
19th	20 November 1990	Saudi Arabia	Riyadh	
20th	5 December 1991	Turkey	Istanbul	
21st	25–29 April 1993	Pakistan	Karachi	
22nd	10–12 December 1994	Morocco	Casablanca	
23rd	9–12 December 1995	Guinea	Conakry	
24th	9–13 December 1996	Indonesia	Jakarta	
25th	15–17 March 1998	Qatar	Doha	
26th	28 June–1 July 1999	Burkina Faso	Ouagadougou	
27th	27 June 2000	Malaysia	Kuala Lumpur	
28th	25–29 June 2001	Mali	Bamako	
29th	25–27 June 2002	Sudan	Khartoum	
30th	28–30 May 2003	Iran	Tehran	
31st	14–16 June 2004	Turkey	Istanbul	
32nd	28–30 June 2005	Yemen	Sana'a	
33rd	19–21 June 2006	Azerbaijan	Baku	
34th	15–17 May 2007	Pakistan	Islamabad	
35th	18–20 June 2008	Uganda	Kampala	
36th	23–25 May 2009	Syria	Damascus	
37th	18–20 May 2010	Tajikistan	Dushanbe	
38th	28–30 June 2011	Kazakhstan	Astana	
39th	15–17 November 2012	Djibouti	Djibouti	
40th	9–11 December 2013	Guinea	Conakry	
41st	18–19 June 2014	Saudi Arabia	Jeddah	
42nd	27–28 May 2015	Kuwait	Kuwait	
43rd	18–19 October 2016	Uzbekistan	Tashkent	
44th	10–11 June 2017	Ivory Coast	Abidjan	
45th	5–6 May 2018	Bangladesh	Dhaka	
46th	1–2 March 2019	United Arab Emirates	Abu Dhabi	
47th	27–28 November 2020	Niger	Niamey	
48th	22–23 March 2022	Pakistan	Islamabad	
49th	16-17 March 2023	Mauritania	Nouakchott	
50th	29-30 August 2024	Cameroon	Yaoundé	
51st	21-22 June 2025	Turkey	Istanbul	
52nd	11-12 April 2026	Iraq	Baghdad	
53rd	2027	Benin	TBA	
54th	2028	TBA	TBA	
55th	2029	Saudi Arabia	TBA	

As of 2025, Bangladesh, Guinea, Libya, Malaysia, Niger and Yemen have hosted the summit twice. Morocco and Turkey 4 times, Pakistan and Saudi Arabia 5 times.
