= Member states of the Organisation of Islamic Cooperation =

- Category: Sovereign state
- Location: Organisation of Islamic Cooperation
- Created: 1969
- Number: 57 members (49 Muslim majority and 8 Christian majority); 5 observer states (3 non-Muslim majority and 2 Muslim majority); Several non-Muslim member/observer candidates (Note: Includes Cambodia, Ethiopia, Georgia, Montenegro, North Macedonia, Ukraine, etc.) (as of 2025)
- Possible types: Republics (47); Monarchies (10)
- Populations: ▲2.04 billion

Among the 57 member countries of the Organisation of Islamic Cooperation (OIC), 49 states are denoted Muslim-majority countries, although two of which—Guinea-Bissau and Cote d'Ivoire—have less than 50% Muslim population. Outside of the Islamic world, eight more countries—Cameroon, Benin, Mozambique, Togo, Uganda, Suriname, Gabon, and Guyana—comprise the 57 full members of the OIC while also being Christian-majority countries

The collective population of OIC member states is over 2.04 billion as of 2025.

== Member states ==
Continent
| Africa | Asia | Europe | South America | Transcontinental |

| Member state | Joined | Population | Muslim percentage | Area (km^{2}) | Official Languages | Notes |
|---|---|---|---|---|---|---|
| Afghanistan; Capital: Kabul | 1969 | 41,144,133 | 99.8% | 652,230 | Dari; Pashto | Suspended 1980 – March 1989 during the Soviet–Afghan War. |
| Algeria; Capital: Algiers | 1969 | 45,847,599 | 99.1% | 2,381,741 | Arabic; Tamazight | |
| Chad; Capital: N'Djamena | 1969 | 19,319,000 | 58% | 1,284,000 | Arabic; French | |
| Egypt; Capital: Cairo | 1969 | 107,206,514 | 95% | 1,002,450 | Arabic | Originally as United Arab Republic. Suspended May 1979 – March 1984 after signing a peace treaty with Israel. |
| Guinea (Note: Also known as Guinea-Conakry.); Capital: Conakry | 1969 | 14,033,298 | 90% | 245,857 | French | |
| Indonesia; Capital: Jakarta | 1969 | 280,813,676 | 87% | 1,904,569 | Indonesian | |
| Iran; Capital: Tehran | 1969 | 86,708,850 | 99.4% | 1,648,195 | Persian | Originally joined as Pahlavi Iran. |
| Jordan; Capital: Amman | 1969 | 10,458,701 | 97.1% | 89,342 | Arabic | |
| Kuwait; Capital: Kuwait City | 1969 | 4,429,966 | 75% | 17,818 | Arabic | |
| Lebanon; Capital: Beirut | 1969 | 6,748,419 | 54% | 10,452 | Arabic | |
| Libya; Capital: Tripoli | 1969 | 7,107,348 | 99% | 1,759,540 | Arabic | |
| Malaysia; Capital: Kuala Lumpur | 1969 | 33,412,468 | 66% | 330,803 | Malay | |
| Mali; Capital: Bamako | 1969 | 21,723,855 | 95% | 1,240,192 | Bambara; French | |
| Mauritania; Capital: Nouakchott | 1969 | 4,957,932 | 100% | 1,030,700 | Arabic | |
| Morocco; Capital: Rabat | 1969 | 38,013,335 | 99% | 446,550 | Arabic; Tamazight | |
| Niger; Capital: Niamey | 1969 | 26,342,784 | 99.3% | 1,267,000 | Hausa | |
| Pakistan; Capital: Islamabad | 1969 | 241,499,431 | 98% | 881,912 | Urdu; English | |
| Palestine; Capital: Jerusalem (Note: Although the capital of Palestine is Jerusalem, the seat of government of the country is located in Ramallah as the entirety of the city of Jerusalem is entirely controlled by Israel, which considers the whole city to be its capital under the 1980 Jerusalem Law and the occupation of East Jerusalem is not entirely recognized by the international community including the OIC member states; although East Jerusalem is envisioned to be the capital of a future Palestinian state, pending developments of a final peace deal between the two parties. See also the status of Jerusalem.) | 1969 | 4,420,549 | 99% | 6,220 | Arabic | |
| Saudi Arabia; Capital: Riyadh | 1969 | 34,220,000 | 95% | 2,149,690 | Arabic | |
| Senegal; Capital: Dakar | 1969 | 18,077,537 | 96.6% | 196,722 | French | |
| Somalia; Capital: Mogadishu | 1969 | 19,000,000 | 99.9% | 637,657 | Arabic; Somali | |
| Sudan; Capital: Khartoum | 1969 | 50,000,000 | 97% | 1,886,068 | Arabic; English | |
| Tunisia; Capital: Tunis | 1969 | 11,400,000 | 99.1% | 163,610 | Arabic | |
| Turkey; Capital: Ankara | 1969 | 86,000,000 | 99.8% | 783,562 | Turkish | |
| Yemen; Capital: Sana'a | 1969 | 25,235,000 | 99.1 | 527,968 | Arabic | Joined separately as North Yemen and South Yemen. Both unified in 1990. |
| Bahrain; Capital: Manama | 1970 | 1,234,571 | 75% | 765 | Arabic | |
| Oman; Capital: Muscat | 1970 | 4,020,000 | 95% | 309,500 | Arabic | |
| Qatar; Capital: Doha | 1970 | 2,174,035 | 66% | 11,586 | Arabic | |
| Syria; Capital: Damascus | 1970 | 21,987,000 | 97% | 185,180 | Arabic | Originally joined as Ba'athist Syria. Suspended August 2012 – March 2025 during the Syrian civil war. |
| United Arab Emirates; Capital: Abu Dhabi | 1971 | 9,446,000 | 75% | 83,600 | Arabic | |
| Sierra Leone; Capital: Freetown | 1972 | 8,400,512 | 80% | 71,740 | English | |
| Bangladesh; Capital: Dhaka | 1974 | 165,158,616 | 92% | 147,570 | Bengali | |
| Gabon; Capital: Libreville | 1974 | 1,711,000 | 12% | 267,668 | French | |
| The Gambia; Capital: Banjul | 1974 | 1,882,450 | 96.4% | 11,295 | English | |
| Guinea-Bissau; Capital: Bissau | 1974 | 1,746,000 | 46% | 36,125 | Portuguese | |
| Uganda; Capital: Kampala | 1974 | 47,729,952 | 15% | 241,550 | English; Swahili | |
| Burkina Faso (Note: Also known as Burkina; formerly referred to as Upper Volta, its official name until 1984.); Capital: Ouagadougou | 1975 | 22,489,126 | 65% | 274,200 | French | |
| Cameroon; Capital: Yaoundé | 1975 | 30,135,732 | 32% | 475,442 | French; English | |
| Comoros; Capital: Moroni | 1976 | 850,886 | 99% | 2,235 | Comorian; French; Arabic | |
| Iraq; Capital: Baghdad | 1976 | 43,500,000 | 99% | 438,317 | Arabic; Kurdish | Originally joined as Ba'athist Iraq. |
| Maldives; Capital: Malé | 1976 | 317,280 | 100% | 300 | Dhivehi | |
| Djibouti; Capital: Djibouti | 1978 | 886,000 | 95% | 23,200 | Arabic; French | |
| Benin; Capital: Porto-Novo | 1982 | 14,111,000 | 29% | 112,622 | French | |
| Brunei; Capital: Bandar Seri Begawan | 1984 | 393,162 | 84% | 5,765 | Malay | |
| Nigeria; Capital: Abuja | 1986 | 206,630,269 | 54% | 923,768 | English | |
| Azerbaijan; Capital: Baku | 1991 | 9,477,100 | 90% | 86,600 | Azerbaijani | |
| Albania; Capital: Tirana | 1992 | 2,821,977 | 52% | 28,748 | Albanian | |
| Kyrgyzstan; Capital: Bishkek | 1992 | 5,976,570 | 90% | 199,951 | Kyrgyz; Russian | |
| Tajikistan; Capital: Dushanbe | 1992 | 8,860,000 | 98% | 143,100 | Tajiki | |
| Turkmenistan; Capital: Ashgabat | 1992 | 5,607,000 | 96% | 488,100 | Turkmen | |
| Mozambique; Capital: Maputo | 1994 | 34,000,000 | 20% | 801,590 | Portuguese | |
| Kazakhstan; Capital: Astana | 1995 | 17,244,000 | 74% | 2,724,900 | Kazakh; Russian | |
| Uzbekistan; Capital: Tashkent | 1995 | 33,492,800 | 97% | 447,400 | Uzbek | |
| Suriname; Capital: Paramaribo | 1996 | 534,189 | 15% | 163,820 | Dutch | |
| Togo; Capital: Lomé | 1997 | 6,993,000 | 19% | 56,785 | French | |
| Guyana; Capital: Georgetown | 1998 | 784,894 | 8% | 214,969 | English | |
| Ivory Coast; Capital: Yamoussoukro | 2001 | 23,202,000 | 42.5 | 322,463 | French | |

== Observer states ==
| Observer state | Joined | Population | Muslim percentage | Area (km^{2}) | Languages | Notes |
|---|---|---|---|---|---|---|
| Bosnia and Herzegovina; Capital: Sarajevo | 1994 | 3,791,622 | 53% | 51,209 | Bosnian; Serbian; Croatian | Given an invitation in 2013 by the OIC to join as a full member. |
| Central African Republic; Capital: Bangui | 1997 | 4,709,000 | 15% | 622,984 | French | |
| Turkish Cypriot State; Capital: North Nicosia | 1979 | 382,836 | 99% | 3,355 | Turkish | See further details (Note: Recognised only by Turkey. Under the name "Turkish Cypriot State", Northern Cyprus is an observer state of the Organisation of Islamic Cooperation. It is claimed in whole by Cyprus.: Designation changed in 2004; Egypt, Iran and the United Arab Emirates requested at September 2014's summit of the OIC in New York City that the Turkish Cypriot State not be referred to in the meeting conclusions.; OIC SG received the president and foreign minister of Northern Cyprus.; In 2017, Northern Cyprus was represented with its official name "Turkish Republic of Northern Cyprus" for the first time at an OIC conference in Saudi Arabia.) |
| Thailand; Capital: Bangkok | 1998 | 64,456,700 | 7% | 513,120 | Thai | |
| Russia; Capital: Moscow | 2005 | 146,048,500 | 12% | 17,125,242 | Russian | |

== Withdrawn ==
| Suspended or withdrawn state | Joined | Notes |
|---|---|---|
| Zanzibar | 1993 | Withdrew August 1993 |

== Observer organisations and communities ==
| Organisation or community | Joined | Notes |
|---|---|---|
| Moro National Liberation Front | 1977 | Blocking membership of the Philippines |

== Observer Islamic institutions ==
| Islamic institution | Joined | Notes |
|---|---|---|
| Parliamentary Union of the OIC Member States | 2000 | |
| Islamic Conference Youth Forum for Dialogue and Cooperation | 2005 | |

== Observer international organisations ==
| Organisation | Joined | Notes |
|---|---|---|
| League of Arab States | 1975 | |
| United Nations | 1976 | |
| Non-Aligned Movement | 1977 | |
| African Union | 1977 | |
| Economic Cooperation Organization | 1995 | |

== Collaborating organization ==
In 2013, the OIC created a permanent observer mission to the EU. In 2016, the EU accredited a Head of Delegation to the OIC.

== Membership attempts ==
- Belarus — Requested observer status in 2010. (Note: Non-Muslim majorities.)
- Brazil — Requested observer status in 2011.
- Cambodia — Requested observer status in 2022.
- Central African Republic — Requested full membership in 2002.
- China — Requested observer status in 2012.
- Democratic Republic of Congo — Requested observer status in 2008 and full membership in 2011.
- Ethiopia — Requested full membership in 2024.
- India — India, where Muslims are a very big population had shown an interest in joining the OIC as a member state at the time of its formation. However, it was opposed by Pakistan. India has never made a formal application to join OIC as an observer or as a member state. While India's potential candidacy is supported by some OIC members, Pakistan's strong opposition and threat to boycott the OIC has effectively led to India's inclusion in the OIC being blocked. The Pakistan Foreign Office has argued that India's inclusion in OIC would violate the rules of the OIC, which require that an aspirant state should not have an ongoing conflict with a member state.
- Kenya — Requested full membership in 2011.
- Liberia — Requested full membership in November 2016.
- Mauritius — Requested full membership in 2002.
- Montenegro — Requested observer status in 2013.
- Nepal — Requested observer status in 2008.
- Philippines — Requested observer status in 2008. The Philippine government has made attempts to join the OIC, but this is opposed by the Moro National Liberation Front, an OIC observer located in the Philippines. The MNLF claims that Philippine membership is unnecessary. In 2009, the country's bid received stronger support and has been advocated by Indonesia, Iran, Malaysia, and the United Arab Emirates, among others. In 2019, one of the leaders of the MNLF, Nir Misuari, was appointed as a special envoy to the organization.
- Serbia — Requested observer status in 2008.
- South Africa — Requested observer status in 2002.
- Sri Lanka — Requested observer status in 2008.
