= FWA =

FWA may refer to:

== Places ==
- Fwa River, in the Congo Basin
- French West Africa, a former colony

== Entertainment and recreation ==
- Film Writers Association
- Florida Writers Association
- Frontier Wrestling Alliance, a British wrestling promotion
- Furry Weekend Atlanta, a fandom convention
- Federation of Welsh Anglers
- Football Writers' Association
- Free Weezy Album, a 2015 album by Lil Wayne

== Government and politics ==
- Fair Work Commission, formerly Fair Work Australia
- Federal Works Agency of the United States
- Fédération wallonne de l'agriculture, a farmers' association in Wallonia
- Flexible work arrangement
- Free Wales Army, a defunct Welsh nationalist paramilitary organization
- Free West Alliance, an American libertarian organization

== Science and technology ==
- Fireworks algorithm
- Fixed Wireless Access, another name for Wireless local loop
- Fluorescent whitening agent
- TheFWA, awards

== Transportation ==
- Fort Wayne International Airport, in Indiana, United States
- Interstate Airlines, a defunct Dutch airline

== Other ==
- Fwâi language, spoken in New Caledonia
- Financial Women's Association, in the United States
