= Carla Gericke =

American writer, activist, and lawyer (born 1972)

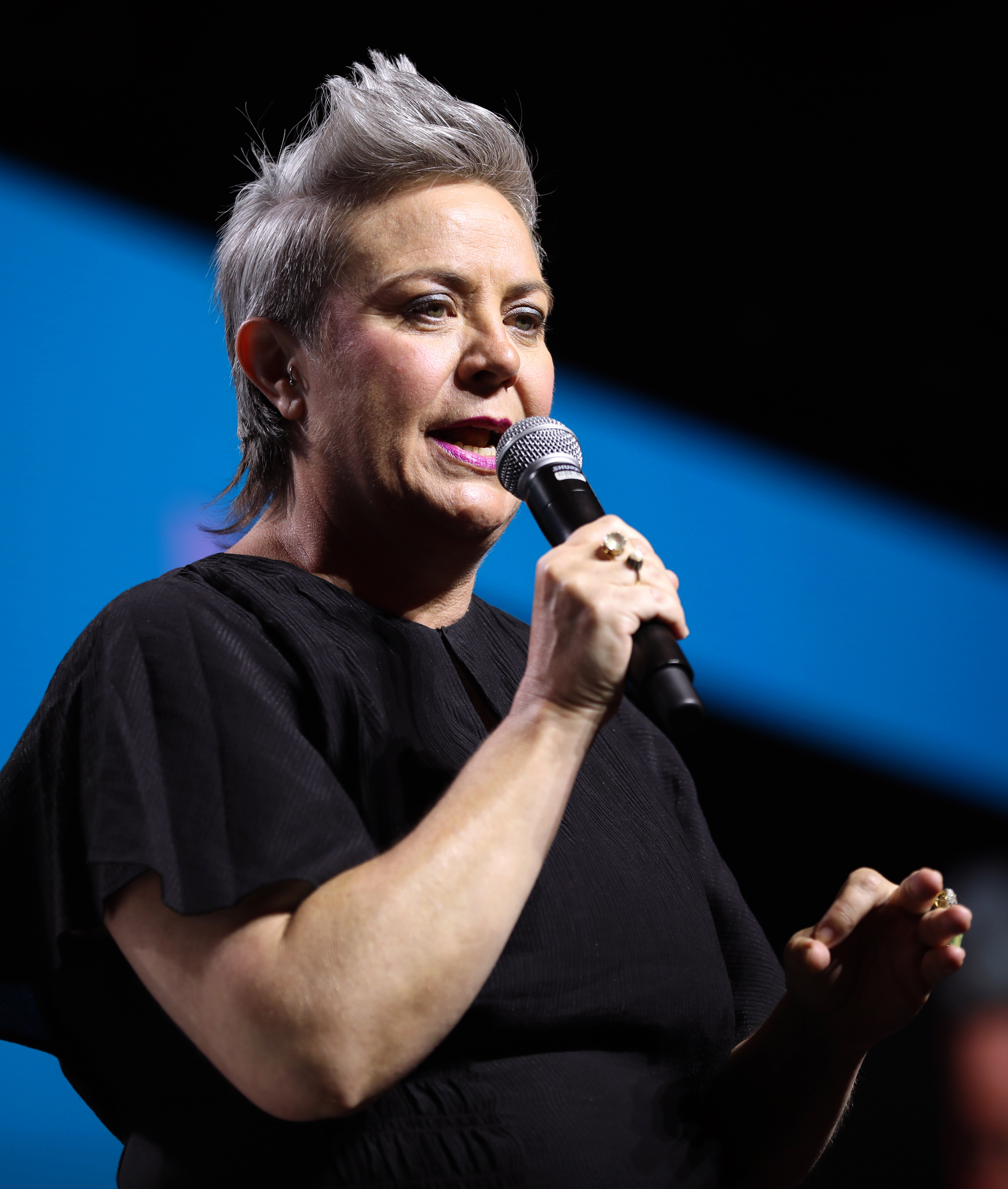
- Gericke speaks in 2024.
- Born: 18 February 1972; Pretoria, South Africa
- Education: University of Pretoria; City College of New York
- Occupations: Lawyer, author, political activist, 2016, 2018, and 2020 New Hampshire State Senate Republican candidate for District 20

Carla Gericke is an author, activist, and attorney. Born in South Africa, she immigrated to the United States in the 1990s after winning a green card in the Diversity Visa Lottery. She became a U.S. citizen in 2000. Gericke practiced law in South Africa, and California, working at Apple Computer, Borland, Logitech, and Scient Corporation. Gericke is President Emeritus of the Free State Project. In 2014, she won a landmark First Circuit Court of Appeals case that affirmed the First Amendment right to film police officers. That same year, she was named one of New Hampshire Magazine's "2014 Remarkable Women" In 2016, Gericke ran as a Republican for New Hampshire State Senate in District 20 (Manchester Wards 3, 4, 10 and 11, and Goffstown) against Democrat Lou D'Allesandro, garnering 40% of the vote in the general election. In 2018, after a successful recount on a write-in campaign on the Libertarian Party's ballot, she ran as a fusion Republican/Libertarian candidate and received 42% of the vote, up two percentage points in a year when District 20 swung 12–15% left due to the "Blue Wave." In 2020, Gericke ran again against D'Allesandro in District 20 and again lost, this time by a vote tally of 13,548 to 10,479, or approximately 56–44%.

== Early life ==
Gericke was born in Pretoria, South Africa, to David (a South African diplomat) and Madalein Gericke. Because of her father's work, she traveled extensively as a child, living in the U.S., Sweden, and Brazil. Her political philosophy developed at a young age. Growing up in South Africa during the apartheid regime of the National Party, she opposed the government's authoritarian and racist policies. She studied law at the University of Pretoria from 1989 to 1993, graduating with a Baccalaureus Procurationis degree. After winning a green card in the Diversity Lottery, she moved to California with her husband. After passing the California Bar, she worked as in-house corporate counsel at Fortune 500 companies. In 2008, she received an M.F.A. in Creative Writing from the City College of New York.

== Activism ==
In February 2008, Gericke moved from New York City to New Hampshire for the Free State Project, a 501c3 nonprofit organization whose mission is to attract 20,000 liberty activists to New Hampshire. She organized the FSP's Porcupine Freedom Festival (colloquially known as "PorcFest") three times in 2009, 2010 and in 2020. She became the president of the FSP in 2011. In this capacity, she has appeared in the media, and was the driving force behind "triggering the move," which occurred on 3 February 2016, when it was announced at a press conference that 20,000 people had signed the pledge. As president, she was very vocal in the media about promoting the Free State Project, and has appeared in outlets such as CNN, Forbes, The Economist, Wired, GQ, Mother Jones, The Washington Post, Fox News, NBC, and The New York Times.

=== Arrest and court case ===
On 24 March 2010, Gericke and others were en route in two cars to a friend's house when they were pulled over by police in the town of Weare, New Hampshire. She was advised she wasn't being pulled over, so she parked at a nearby school, and took out a video camera to film the interaction. Though the camera wasn't properly functioning, and she had announced to the officer that she was recording, a second officer approached her vehicle and demanded to see her camera. When she failed to hand it over, she was arrested. She was initially charged with disobeying a police officer and obstructing a government official. After an argument at the police station when the Weare PD refused to give her a receipt for her confiscated camera, she was also charged with unlawful interception of oral communications, a felony carrying a maximum 7-year sentence. All charges were dropped before going to trial. Gericke filed suit against the town and the officers, claiming in her pleadings that the officers' actions were "retaliatory prosecution in breach of her constitutional rights."

The case went to the U.S. First Circuit Court of Appeals. The defendants, the individual officers involved in the incident, the Town of Weare, and Weare Police Department, filed motions for summary judgment, claiming they had qualified immunity because there was no established right to film a traffic stop. The court denied the motions, ruling instead that the officers had no reasonable expectation to privacy while performing their duties in public. Based on a previous ruling, Glik v. Cunniffe, the court found that Gericke's right to film the officers was established at the time of her arrest. Furthermore, the Appeals Court found that Gericke's First Amendment rights had been violated and that the officers were not entitled to qualified immunity. The case was settled for $57,500. Regarding the outcome, Gericke said:

I'm glad the case is settled. It was a long road, but we now have a binding precedent affirming the First Amendment to record police at traffic stops. I am cautiously optimistic that the settlement will cause law enforcement to be more hesitant to arrest videographers exercising their rights. I think we've already seen positive change come out of this case in that regard.

=== Concord BEARCAT ===
In 2013, after a nationwide project about police militarization by the ACLU, it was discovered that the Concord Police Department had referred to Free Staters as domestic terrorists in a federal grant application to the United States Department of Homeland Security for a Lenco BearCat, stating:

The State of New Hampshire's experience with terrorism slants primarily towards the domestic type. We are fortunate that our State has not been victimized from a mass casualty event from an international terrorism strike however on the domestic front, the threat is real and here. Groups such as the Sovereign Citizens, Free Staters and Occupy New Hampshire are active and present daily challenges.

Gericke responded by saying:

The Concord NH Police Department has made false and misleading statements in a grant application for $258,024 in federal funds from the Department of Homeland Security ("DHS") to receive a Lenco BEARCAT armored vehicle… I am alarmed and appalled at the cleverly worded insinuation that the FSP is a domestic terrorist threat, or that 'Free Staters' are 'active' and 'present daily challenges' to the Concord Police Department.

Individuals who sign up for the FSP generally subscribe to the non-aggression principle, an ethical stance which asserts that 'aggression' is inherently illegitimate. 'Aggression' is defined as the initiation of physical force against persons or property, the threat of such, or fraud upon persons or their property. Our website specifically states: 'Anyone who promotes violence, racial hatred, or bigotry is not welcome.'

The New Hampshire Constitution states: 'All men are born equally free and independent; therefore, all government of right originates from the people, is founded in consent, and instituted for the general good.' To discriminate against 'Free Staters' for their pro-liberty, pro-peace, small government ideological beliefs, and to defame an organization in the manner set forth in the DHS grant is unconscionable, and unconstitutional.

When the matter was brought before Concord's City Council, the issue was tabled after many residents came out to voice their opposition to the city's purchase of such a vehicle. Gericke and other activists led a campaign to stop the city from accepting the money based on false claims. In the end, the council voted to accept the grant and buy the BearCat. However, John Duvall, Concord's Chief of Police, did resign after the incident.

=== Manchester lockdowns ===
On May 13, 2016, an entire neighborhood on the west side of Manchester, New Hampshire, where Gericke is a homeowner, was placed under lockdown with a shelter-in-place "order" when two officers suffered non-life-threatening injuries during a manhunt. The lockdown started and continued for more than five hours after the suspect had been apprehended. According to a Union Leader op-ed, the neighborhood "felt like a city under siege." Several schools were closed for the whole day, and streets were cordoned off until 3pm, with residents unable to access their cars and thus unable to move freely or go to work. Heavily armed law enforcement officials with automatic weapons and police dogs patrolled the streets and searched cars, trash cans, and yards as helicopters circled overhead.

On June 7, 2016, Gericke organized a rally at Manchester City Hall, saying in a press release prior to the event:

Back in 2013, the City of Concord ignored more than 1,500 petitioners who expressed their disapproval of that BEARCAT acquisition. Folks worried then that it would lead to increased use of militarized police tactics in New Hampshire. We now know these concerns were real. I grew up in South Africa under apartheid – a police state – and even there, you did not see daytime curfews being imposed on entire neighborhoods. I moved to America to escape such things… not to see them manifest in my own backyard. Free people must be able to move freely, and liberty should never be sacrificed for ‘security’. It is exactly in times of crisis that you should not give up your constitutional rights and civil liberties.

Gericke addressed about 60 people during the rally to highlight what organizers said was a growing militarization of city police. Signs read "More Mayberry, Less Fallujah," "Lock Downs are for Prisons," and "Free People Move Freely." In her speech Gericke said:

When I say liberty, I mean as enshrined in the Constitution, and specifically the 4th Amendment, which says: 'The right of the people to be secure in their persons, houses, papers, and effects, against unreasonable searches and seizures, shall not be violated, and no Warrants shall issue, but upon probable cause, supported by Oath or affirmation, and particularly describing the place to be searched, and the persons or things to be seized.' SHALL NOT BE VIOLATED. It doesn't say, except when X or Y happens. It doesn't say except for lockdowns or shelter-in-place orders. It doesn't say that law enforcement can rifle through people's garbage cans or point guns at people's heads. Daytime curfews have no place in a free society. And they damn well have no place in the Live Free or Die state.

Gericke continues to monitor police militarization, lockdowns, and SWAT raids in the City of Manchester and throughout New Hampshire.

=== ACLU-NH Surveillance Camera Lawsuit ===
In 2019, the ACLU-NH acting on behalf of several plaintiffs, including Gericke, filed an injunction against the City of Manchester to try to stop high-resolution night-vision surveillance cameras from being permanently installed downtown.

=== ReOpen NH Rallies ===
Gericke was an early critic of Governor Sununu's lockdown and stay-at-home orders issued in response to the COVID-19 pandemic, saying in NH Journal on 21 April 2020, "Freedom is the answer, what's the question? It is possible to be concerned about the virus, and the economic downturn and the destruction of our civil liberties. I am, which is why I attended the rally on Saturday. I don't underestimate the virus, but I also don't underestimate the cost of the shutdown or the dangers of trading liberty for a false sense of security." Gericke spoke at several ReOpen NH rallies in Concord and across the state, receiving death wishes and threats in response. In June 2020, Gericke proceeded with hosting the Free State Project's 17th Annual Porcupine Freedom Festival (PorcFest), stating the gathering, which drew more than 1,000 attendees over the week, was a First and Second Amendment protected assembly.

== Writing ==
In 2020, Gericke published her first book, The Ecstatic Pessimist a collection of award-winning short stories, flash fiction pieces, and essays and speeches about the Free State Project and Gericke's activism in New Hampshire. Nick Gillespie, Editor-at-Large of Reason magazine called it, "a fantastic package of writings... veering from fiction to autobiography and memoir to political polemics about Utopian attempts to remake the world as a better place in a very pragmatic way."

Gericke has written numerous blogs, articles, short stories, and poems. She is currently working on a new book about her 2010 arrest for filming police officers and the landmark court case that followed. She blogs daily at her website, Carla Gericke: The Art of Independence, covering topics like food freedom, Ancestral/keto/paleo living, politics, and her activism.

From 2008–2013, Gericke worked at the New Hampshire Writers' Project at Southern New Hampshire University, starting as program manager and leaving as acting executive director, during which time she five times ran Writers' Day, the largest writing conference in New Hampshire.

== Other projects ==
Gericke cohosts a local cable access show called Manch Talk. She also co-hosts the Told You So podcast. As of June 2024, Gericke has been president of New Hampshire Exit Now!, an organization working to secede New Hampshire from the United States, inspired by Brexit.

== Bibliography ==
- "Ghost of a Dream" in Lumina (Spring 2009)
- Translation of acclaimed South African author Eben Venter's Gabriel on author's website (Winter 2008)
- "The Ecstatic Pessimist" in Bonne Route #19 (anthology, Winter 2007)
- "Father Let Me Walk With Thee" in Ep;phany (Fall 2007)
- "The Vitiation of John White Junior" at Lew Rockwell (Spring 2007)
- "Duck, Duck, Goose" at Word Riot (Winter 2007)
- "When We Talk About Words" in Dog Days (anthology, 2006), reprinted in Promethean (Fall 2007)
- "The Silent House of Noble" in Inkwell (Fall 2006)
- "Blue Inked" at Rumble (Fall 2005)
- "Double Happiness" in HerStory (anthology, Fall 2005)
- "Perfect Timing" in Better Non Sequitur (anthology, Fall 2005)
- "Holding Down a Dream" at Underground Voices (Winter 2005)
- "The Devil in Her Eyes" at Pindeldyboz (Fall 2004)
- "Victor/Victorious" in Wild Strawberries (Summer 2004)

== See also ==
- Libertarianism in the United States
- List of peace activists
- New Hampshire Liberty Alliance
- Politics of New Hampshire
- Jason Sorens
- Jeremy Kauffman
