= Serik Tolbassy =

- Born: November 17, 1965 (age 60); Kzyl-Orda, Kazakh SSR, Soviet Union (now: Kazakhstan, Kyzylorda)
- Education: Alma-Ata Institute of Railway Engineers Research Institute of Building Constructions (TSNIISK) named after V. A. Koucherenko
- Occupations: Businessman; philanthropist; Founder of TS Development
- Spouse: Gulnara Tolbassy (m. 1990)
- Children: Alisher Tolbassy, Alikhan Tolbassy, Alua Tolbassy, Armanzhan Tolbassy

Serik Karabekovich Tolbassy (Kazakh: Серік Қарабекұлы Төлбасы; born September 17, 1965, Kyzylorda) is a Kazakhstani entrepreneur and philanthropist, founder of the TS Development group of companies.

He is the founder of the Serik Tolbassy Foundation (established in 2007), founder and chairman of the private foundation Tennis League TS (established in 2022), and serves as a regional trustee of the IQanat Educational Foundation for the Turkistan Region.

== Biography ==
=== Early life and education ===
Serik Tolbassy was born in the city of Kyzylorda, Kazakh SSR. At the age of six, his family moved to Shymkent, where he graduated with honors from school-gymnasium No.40 named after Alpamys Batyr. From 1984 to 1986, he served in the Air Defense Forces with the rank of Sergeant of the Rocket Forces.

In 1989, he graduated with honors from the Alma-Ata Institute of Railway Transport Engineers with a degree in Industrial and Civil Engineering. He subsequently worked there as a junior research associate in the bridge construction laboratory.

From 1990 to 1992, he studied at the graduate school of the Kucherenko Central Research Institute of Structures Construction in Moscow.

== Business ==
In 1997, Serik Tolbassy founded the investment and construction group of companies TS Development. From 2002 to 2020, TS Development completed over 500,000 square metres of residential and commercial real estate. The total volume of investments in its projects exceeded $600 million.

=== TSPM ===
Since September 2020, Tolbassy has been the founder and chairman of the Board of Directors of TSPM (TS Property Management), a consulting company specializing in the valuation, analysis, and management of commercial real estate assets.

=== Net worth ===
According to the Forbes Kazakhstan "Top 75 Wealthiest Businesspeople of Kazakhstan — 2024" ranking, Serik Tolbassy ranked 39th. As of May 2024, his assets were valued at $224 million.

In 2023, he was listed among the top three rentiers in Kazakhstan, according to Forbes Kazakhstan.

== Philanthropic activities ==
In 2007, the Serik Tolbassy Foundation was established to implement charitable and socially significant projects in healthcare, education, sports, and culture.

In 2016, the foundation launched the StartTime crowdfunding platform to support startups.

In 2021, the foundation allocated 100 million tenge for the construction of more than 110 modern sports grounds in Shymkent to promote healthy living and youth development.

Since 2022, the Serik Tolbassy Foundation has been the official sponsor of the Republic of Kazakhstan's Paralympic wheelchair tennis team.

Since 2018, Serik Tolbassy has served as a trustee of the IQanat Foundation for the Turkistan Region, a programme that supports rural students and teachers across Kazakhstan. The initiative currently covers 166 districts nationwide.

In 2020, during the COVID-19 pandemic, the Serik Tolbassy Foundation donated 25 million tenge to the Almaty City Public Health Department to purchase rapid coronavirus testing kits and ventilators.

== Family ==
Serik Tolbassy has been married to Gulnara Tolbassy (née Baituraeva) since 1990. They have four children: Alisher (born 1991), Alikhan (born 1997), Alua (born 2003), and Armanzhan (born 2009).

== Awards ==
In 2015, he was awarded the departmental badge of honour "Құрметті құрылысшы" (Honoured Builder).

In 2016, he received a jubilee medal marking the 25th anniversary of Kazakhstan's independence, followed in 2018 by the "Astana — 20 Years" commemorative medal.

In 2019, he was granted the title of Honorary Citizen of Shymkent, and in 2021, he was awarded the Order of Parasat for his services to the nation.
