= The Libertarian Enterprise =

American online publication (1995–2023)

The Libertarian Enterprise was an online publication begun in October 1995 by L. Neil Smith. At the time of his death in 2021, a new issue was being posted every Sunday, however, the site's security certificate expired August 1, 2023.

In addition to the founder, authors whose works have appeared in The Libertarian Enterprise include: Sean Gabb of Libertarian Alliance, Sarah Hoyt, Victor Milán, Anders Monsen, Jason Sorens, Vin Suprynowicz, Claire Wolfe, and Aaron Zelman.

One noteworthy article which appeared in The Libertarian Enterprise is the announcement in July 2001 of the Free State Project. Written by Jason Sorens, this essay was the initial launch point for the Free State Project and related efforts such as Free State Wyoming.

Published monthly in 1995 and through July 1996, The Libertarian Enterprise began to come out semi-monthly in August 1996. The 1997 Spring Creek flood delayed the publication for a few months. The editor of the publication resigned in 1997, which may account for the sparse publication schedule in 1998. Semi-monthly publication began again in earnest in the second half of 1999 and continued through 2000. Weekly (or more frequent) issues began in 2001. As of 5 November 2017, it was on its 947th issue.

Items are mostly prose and non-fiction, though some poetry and some fiction have appeared in the zine. The magazine began a new format with issue 176 in June 2002. The publication was also edited by Ken Holder for a few years.
