= Askar Mussinov =

Kazakh diplomat and politician (1961–2024)

- Асқар Мусинов
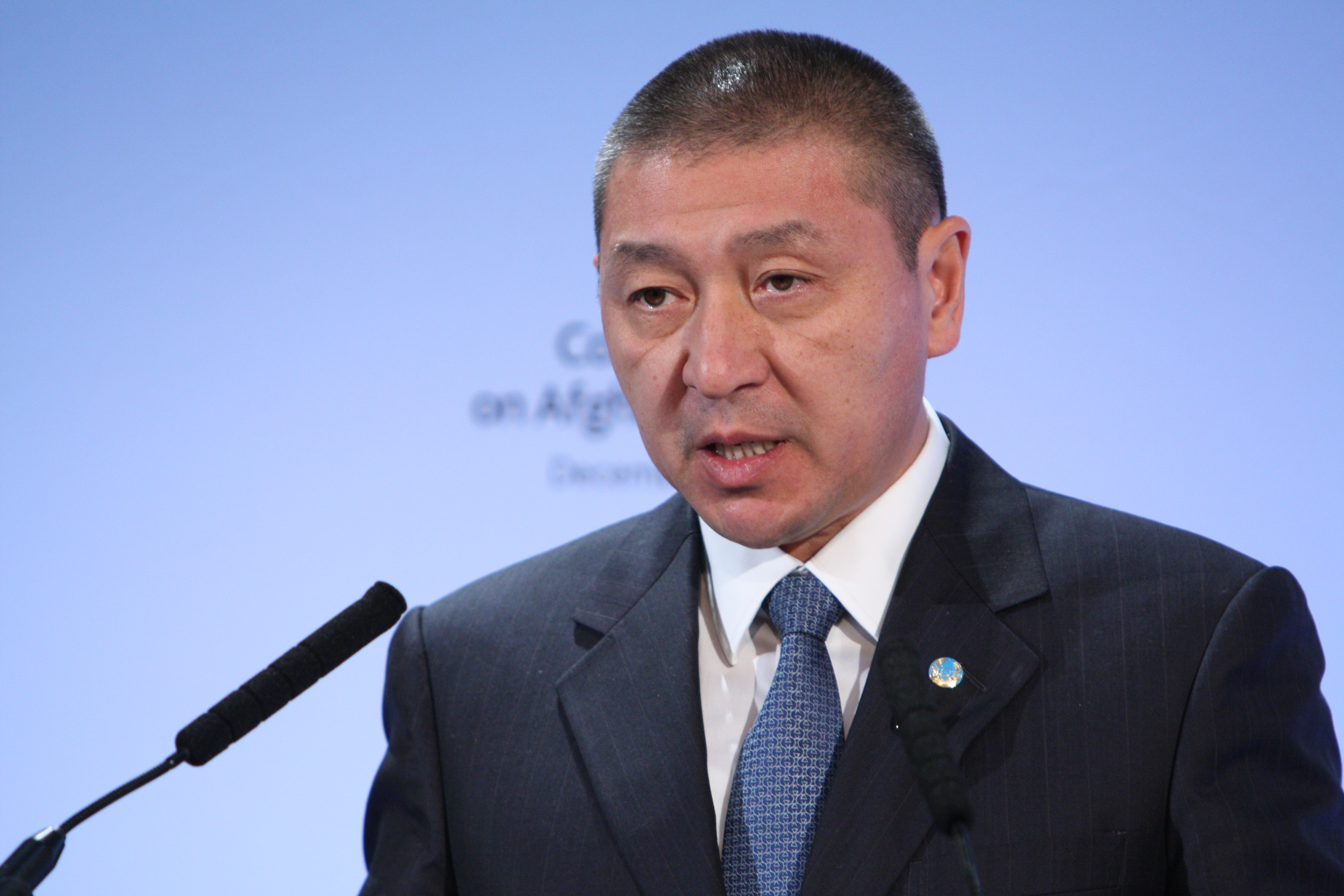
- Mussinov in 2014

Director General of the Islamic Organisation for Food Security
- In office 1 January 2024 – 10 February 2024
- Preceded by: Yerlan Baidaulet

Personal details
- Born: Askar Akhmetuly Mussinov; 11 April 1961 Alma-Ata, Kazakh SSR, USSR
- Died: 10 February 2024 (aged 62)
- Education: Leningrad State University
- Occupation: Diplomat

Askar Akhmetuly Mussinov (Kazakh: Асқар Ахметұлы Мусинов; 11 April 1961 – 10 February 2024) was a Kazakh diplomat and politician.

== Biography ==
Born in Alma-Ata on 11 April 1961, Mussinov studied Eastern studies and philology at Leningrad State University. He began his career as a military translator in Libya from 1984 to 1987. From 1987 to 1991, he was Deputy Minister of Foreign Affairs for the USSR and subsequently Kazakhstan. From 1991 to 1992, he was Ambassador of Russia to Saudi Arabia. He then held various senior positions within the Ministry of Foreign Affairs and was chief of protocol for the President from 1997 to 1999. He was then Kazakhstan's ambassador to Egypt from 1999 to 2002 and to Saudi Arabia from 2002 to 2006. He was ambassador to the United Arab Emirates, Bahrain, Kuwait, Oman, Qatar, and South Africa from 2006 to 2013.

In July 2014, Mussinov was appointed Deputy Minister of Foreign Affairs. He then worked in the General Secretariat of the Organisation of Islamic Cooperation. On 5 May 2018, he was elected Deputy Secretary General of the Organization of Islamic Cooperation for Science and Technology. He then became Director General of the Islamic Organisation for Food Security, taking office on 1 January 2024.

Askar Mussinov died on 10 February 2024, at the age of 62.

== Honors ==
- Order of Parasat (2015)
- Order of Friendship, 2nd class (2005)
- Order of Indepdence of the United Arab Emirates
