= Kazakhstan–Syria relations =

- Kazakhstan: Syria

Kazakhstan–Syria relations refers to the bilateral relations between Kazakhstan and Syria. Kazakhstan has a consulate in Damascus. Syria has a non-resident ambassador in Moscow.

== Historical relations ==
Relations between the two countries have been limited but cordial since they established diplomatic ties in 1992. Kazakhstan has played a notable diplomatic role in the Syrian conflict, particularly through its hosting of the Astana peace talks, which began in 2017. Co-sponsored by Russia, Türkiye, and Iran, the talks aimed to reduce violence and establish de-escalation zones within Syria. The Astana Process, endorsed by the United Nations, facilitated negotiations among key external actors and contributed to Syria’s reintegration into the Arab League. However, despite Kazakhstan’s efforts, the de-escalation zones were violated by Syrian government forces. In June 2023, Kazakhstan announced it would no longer host future rounds of talks, citing the achievement of the process’s objectives.

== Military relations ==
Kazakhstan–Syria military relations have been characterized more by diplomacy than direct military cooperation. Since January 2017, Kazakhstan has hosted the Astana Process, a series of peace talks initiated by Russia, Turkey, and Iran to mediate between the Syrian government and opposition groups. While proposals emerged in mid-2017 for Kazakhstan to contribute troops to a multinational force in Syria, particularly in Idlib, Kazakhstan declined involvement, emphasizing its neutral foreign policy and opting not to deploy forces under the Collective Security Treaty Organization (CSTO). From 2017 to 2023, Kazakhstan hosted 20 rounds of talks, which contributed to ceasefire agreements and the establishment of de-escalation zones. The process concluded in June 2023, with Kazakhstan citing its objectives as fulfilled.

Kazakhstan has contributed to international peacekeeping efforts in Syria through its participation in the United Nations Disengagement Observer Force (UNDOF) mission. On 10 April 2025, Kazakhstan deployed its second national peacekeeping contingent to the Golan Heights as part of the UNDOF mission. The contingent, comprising 139 service members, including two women, was selected on a voluntary basis and underwent extensive training in professional competencies and ethical standards. The troops were tasked with patrolling, guarding checkpoints, neutralizing explosive devices, and supporting UN personnel through escort and evacuation duties.

This deployment followed the successful return of Kazakhstan’s first UNDOF peacekeeping contingent, also consisting of 139 personnel, including seven women, who completed a year-long mission in the region. The contingent was commended for its high level of operational readiness and professionalism, receiving praise from UN leadership for its role in reinforcing bases, providing armed escorts during active conflict, and maintaining safety under fire. One member, Sergeant Ardak Kurtibayeva, served both as a medical officer and a gender adviser, highlighting the role of female peacekeepers in conflict zones. President Kassym-Jomart Tokayev praised the peacekeepers during an official ceremony on 14 April referring to them as "messengers of peace".

Since 2014, Kazakhstan has contributed over 700 personnel to specialized UN missions and deployed around 80 military observers and staff officers.

== Economic relations ==
Kazakhstan–Syria economic relations are characterized by humanitarian cooperation and limited trade engagement. Following the devastating earthquake in Syria and Türkiye on 6 February 2023, Kazakhstan sent 50 tons of humanitarian aid to Syria, including canned food, winter tents, warm clothing, and bedding. The aid, coordinated with the Islamic Organization for Food Security, was delivered to Aleppo in four flights beginning 11 February, after President Kassym-Jomart Tokayev ordered assistance on 8 February. Syrian President Bashar al-Assad expressed gratitude for Kazakhstan’s support, citing the country’s demonstration of “high human and moral values”. While Syria is not among Kazakhstan’s top trading partners, broader Kazakh trade initiatives in the region have included Türkiye, another key stakeholder in Syrian affairs.
