= List of agricultural organizations =

This is a list of agricultural organizations.

== International ==
- 4-H
- FAO
- International Institute of Agriculture (defunct)

=== Europe ===
- COPA-COGECA
- Conseil Européen des Jeunes Agriculteurs
- Union of European Academies for Sciences Applied to Agriculture, Food and Nature - UEAA

== Belgium ==
- Boerenbond
- Fédération wallonne de l'agriculture

== Brazil ==
- Instituto Agronômico de Campinas

== Ireland ==
- Irish Farmers' Association

== Switzerland ==
- Union suisse des paysans (Schweizer Bauernverband / Unione Svizzera dei Contadini)

== United Kingdom ==
- National Farmers' Union of England and Wales
- National Farmers' Union of Scotland
- Ulster Farmers' Union

== United States ==
- American Farm Bureau Federation
- American Poultry Association
- National FFA Organization (Future Farmers of America)
- Institute of Food and Agricultural Sciences
- Ohio Corn & Wheat Growers Association
- The National Grange of the Order of Patrons of Husbandry (The Grange)
- National Farmers Union

== New Zealand ==
- Animal Health Board
- Federated Farmers
- Ministry of Agriculture and Forestry
