= Ashimjan Akhmetov =

Kazakh scientist, lawyer, engineer, and politician

Äşımjan Ahmetov
- Әшімжан Ахметов

Deputy Minister of Education and Science of Kazakhstan
- In office November 1999 – ?

Deputy Minister of Industry and Trade of Kazakhstan
- In office 1995–1996

Member of the 1st Mäjilis
- In office 30 January 1996 – 1999
- Preceded by: position established

Member of the 13th Supreme Council of Kazakhstan
- In office 1994–1995
- Succeeded by: position abolished

Member of the Mangystau Regional Mäslihat
- In office 2001–2007
- Succeeded by: position abolished

Personal details
- Born: 23 February 1950 Tole Bi, Shu District,
- Died: 15 September 2012 (aged 62)
- Awards: Order of Parasat; Order of Kurmet; Astana Medal; "10 Years of Independence of the Republic of Kazakhstan" Medal
- Scientific career
- Education: Saint Petersburg State Institute of Technology
- Fields: Academician; professor; doctor of technical sciences
- Institutions: Jambyl Institute of Hydromelioration and Construction (dean); Taraz State University (rector); East Kazakhstan State University (rector)

Äşımjan Süleimenūly Ahmetov (Note: Often transliterated as Ashimzhan Suleimenovich Akhmetov through a Russified Romanization of Ашимжан Сулейменович Ахметов.) (Kazakh: Әшімжан Сүлейменұлы Ахметов; 23 February 1950 – 15 September 2012) was a Kazakh scientist, lawyer, engineer, and politician.

In the 1990s, he served as Deputy Minister of Industry and Trade and Deputy Minister of Education and Science of Kazakhstan. From 1994 to 1995, he was a Member of the Supreme Council of Kazakhstan during its XIII session, and from 1996 to 1999, he was a member of the Mäjilis during its 1st session. He was the rector of several Kazakh universities, a candidate of legal sciences, a doctor of technical sciences, a professor, and an academician. He was also the author of numerous patents in the field of chemistry.

== Biography ==
=== Education and work ===
Akhmetov was born on 23 February 1950 in the village of Tole Bi, Shu District, Jambyl Region, Kazakh Soviet Socialist Republic. He was of Kazakh nationality. In 1973, he graduated with honors from the Saint Petersburg State Institute of Technology, earning a degree as a chemical engineer-technologist. In 1978, he completed his postgraduate studies at the same institution. He obtained the degree of Candidate of Legal Sciences, and later a Doctor of Technical Sciences. His doctoral thesis focused on current issues in ecology and environmental management. He was awarded the title of professor and, in 1996, the title of academician of the Engineering Academy of the Republic of Kazakhstan. In 2001, he received the title of academician of the Academy of Sciences of the Higher School of the Republic of Kazakhstan.

Since 1973, he worked as an equipment operator and shift leader at the Jambyl Production Association Chimprom, secretary of the Komsomol committee, and lecturer in chemistry at the Jambyl Institute of Hydromelioration and Construction. From 1975, he was a postgraduate student at the Saint Petersburg State Institute of Technology. From 1978, he held positions as a senior lecturer, associate professor, head of the "Building Materials and Chemistry" department, dean of the General Engineering Faculty, vice-rector, and secretary of the party committee at the Jambyl Institute of Hydromelioration and Construction. From 1989, he was a doctoral candidate at the Saint Petersburg State Institute of Technology, general director of the permanent representation of the Union for the Support of the Kazakh Economy Kazakhstan – Sankt Petersburg. From 1992 to 1993, he served as the first vice president of the joint-stock holding company Karatau.

=== Political activity ===
In 1994, he was elected a deputy of the XIII session of the Supreme Council of the Republic of Kazakhstan. He served as the deputy chairman and later chairman of the Subcommittee on Science, Education, and New Technologies. He was also the chairman of the Committee on Industry, Energy, Transport, and Communications. In 1995, he became the deputy minister of industry and trade of Kazakhstan. On 30 January 1996, he was elected a deputy of the I session of the Mäjilis, where he served as chairman of the Committee on Ecology and Environmental Management. During his time in parliament, he initiated five legislative acts related to ecology and construction. From November 1999, he was the deputy minister of education and science of Kazakhstan. From 2001 to 2007, he was a deputy of the Mangystau Regional Maslikhat. He was a member of the National Democratic Party Nur Otan. From July 2006 to at least 2011, he was a member of its political bureau.

=== Academic activity ===
From May 2001, he worked as the rector of Aktau State University. From August 2005, he was the rector of East Kazakhstan State University. From April 2006, he served as the rector of the Academy of Public Administration under the President of the Republic of Kazakhstan. From June 2008 until his death, he was the rector of Taraz State University. He was the chairman of the doctoral council in the specialty "Ecology and Geoecology" at this university. He was a member of the Assembly of the People of Kazakhstan and the Council for Cooperation in the Field of Education of the Commonwealth of Independent States. He also served as chairman of the Kazakh National Cultural Center.

He died on 15 September 2012. The farewell ceremony took place at the Academy of Sciences of Kazakhstan in Almaty, attended by deputies of parliament, government members, rectors of Kazakh universities, professors, and lecturers of Taraz State University, as well as prominent figures from science and politics. Among those present were the Minister of Education and Science Bakhytzhan Zhumagulov, Deputy Minister of Education and Science Makhmetgali Sarybekov, and Akim of the Jambyl Region Kanat Bozumbayev. Funeral ceremonies were also held at the Taraz State University. Ashimjan Akhmetov was buried in Almaty on September 17.

== Controversies ==
At the end of 1999, Kazakh media highlighted that all deputies of the I session of the parliament who did not make it to the II session of the Mäjilis soon received positions in executive bodies. Ashimjan Akhmetov was one such person. According to the media, this phenomenon was inconsistent with the spirit of democracy and lacked transparency.

== Works ==
Ashimjan Akhmetov authored 4 monographs and over 200 scientific papers and articles in various publications, including:

- Protection of the Biosphere During Acid Processing of Phosphates, 1991 or 1992, p. 262. (in Russian);
- On the Way to a Smart Economy, Znamia Truda, p. 3, 29 October 2008. (in Russian).

He was also the author of at least 9 patents in the field of chemistry:

- Method for producing Prussian blue (co-author, 2001);
- Method for producing a water-soluble polyelectrolyte with sulfur suspension stabilizing properties (co-author, 2010);
- Method for producing a water-soluble polyelectrolyte with flocculating properties (2010);
- Method for producing a water-soluble polyelectrolyte for soil stabilization (2010);
- Method for producing a water-soluble polymer for stabilizing clay suspensions (co-author, 2011);
- Method for stabilizing aqueous sulfur dispersion (co-author, 2012);
- Method for producing a water-soluble polyelectrolyte for soil stabilization (co-author, 2012);
- Method for producing a water-soluble polyelectrolyte with flocculating properties (2013);
- Method for producing a water-soluble polymer for stabilizing clay suspensions (co-author, 2013).

== Awards and honors ==
- Order of Parasat (2008)
- Order of Kurmet
- Astana Medal
- "10 Years of Independence of the Republic of Kazakhstan" Medal
- "10 Years of the Parliament of the Republic of Kazakhstan" Medal
- "20 Years of Independence of the Republic of Kazakhstan" Medal
- Achmet Baitursynov Medal (awarded by the Association of Higher Educational Institutions of the Republic of Kazakhstan)
- "Honored Worker of Education of the Republic of Kazakhstan" Badge
- "Outstanding Worker of Education" Badge
- "Golden Irbis" Badge
- Award from the International Movement "Kindness Will Save the World"

== Personal life ==
Akhmetov was married and had two sons.
