= Porcupine Freedom Festival =

Annual festival in New Hampshire, USA

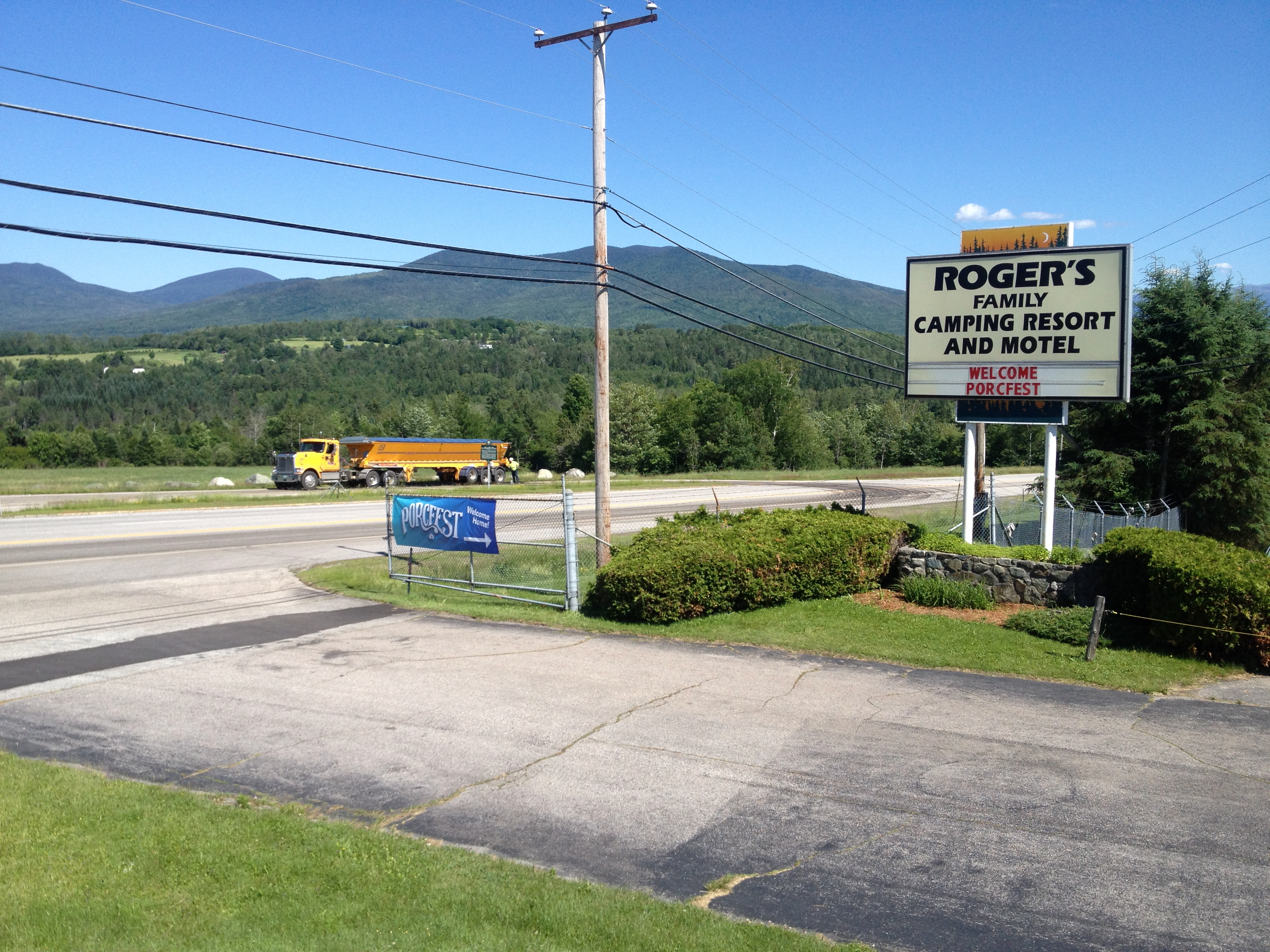
- Venue: Roger's Campground
- Location: Lancaster, New Hampshire
- Country: United States
- Founded: 2004
- Most recent: June 16-22, 2025

The Porcupine Freedom Festival, colloquially referred to as PorcFest, is an event held annually every June since 2004 in the U.S. state of New Hampshire. The festival is the main event held by the Free State Project, a libertarian organization that advocates for the relocation of libertarians to New Hampshire in order to make the state a stronghold for their movement. The festival has been described as "the libertarian version of Burning Man" and "the largest gathering of libertarians in the world". The festival on average hosts approximately 1,500 attendees.

== Background ==
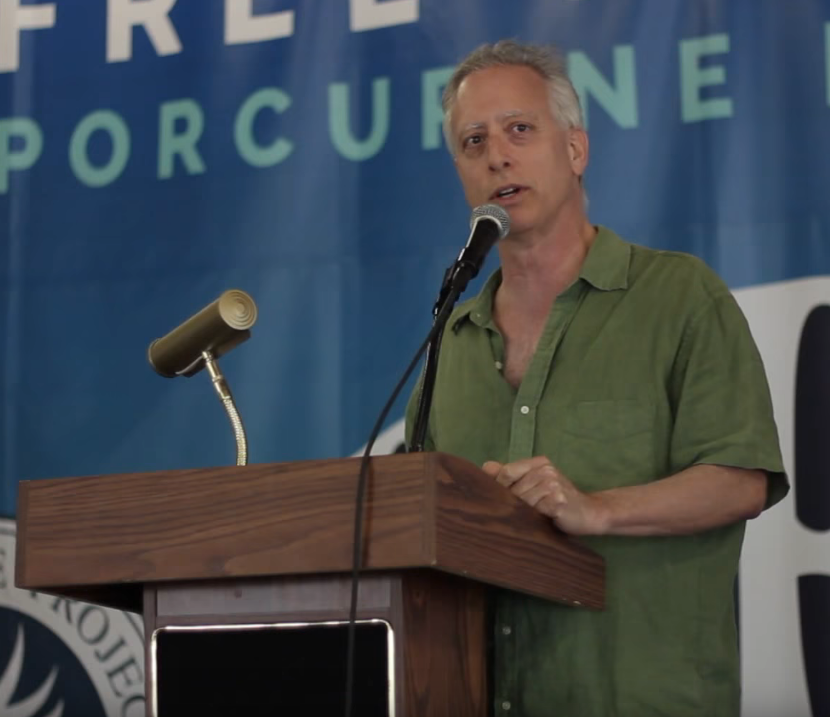
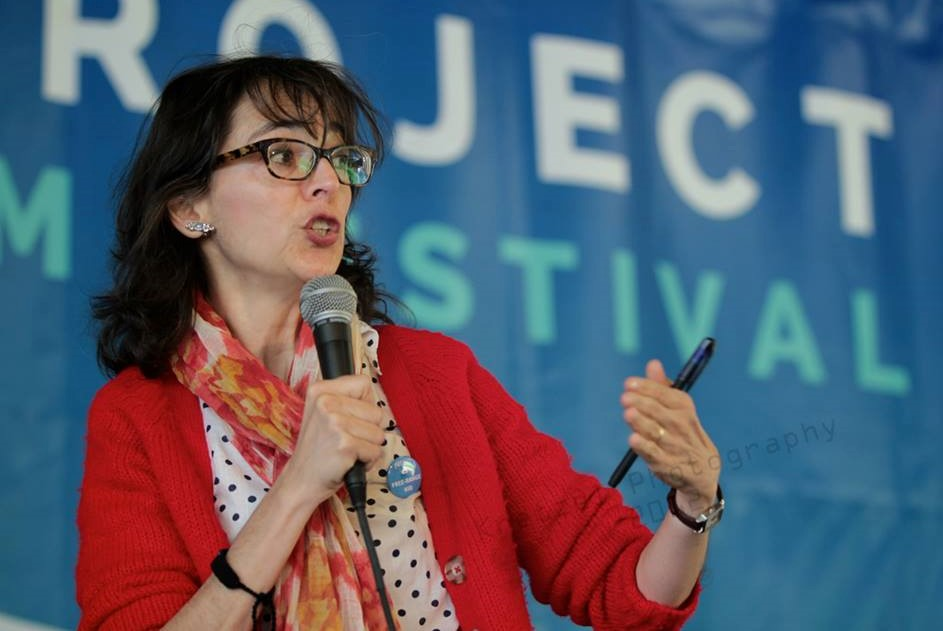
Russ Baker and Lenore Skenazy speaking at PorcFest in 2015

The Free State Project originated from a 2001 essay by then-Yale University student (and later lecturer at Dartmouth College) Jason Sorens. The idea behind the project is to get 20,000 libertarians to move to New Hampshire, a state with a low population where a group of that size could yield significant political influence. By 2014, about 1,500 libertarians had already moved to the state, and several "Free Staters" have been elected to the state government, including Andrew Prout of the New Hampshire House of Representatives. The Free State Project hosts two annual events in the state: The New Hampshire Liberty Forum, a convention-style event, and the Porcupine Freedom Festival, which is a weeklong event held at a campground in Lancaster, New Hampshire.

== History ==
The festival began in 2004, one year after New Hampshire was selected as the target state for the Free State Project. The festival is named after the porcupine, which serves as a mascot for the Free State Movement.

The festival is known for its embrace of cryptocurrencies and precious metals over Federal Reserve Notes, as most vendors accept cryptocurrencies such as Bitcoin, Bitcoin Cash, and Dogecoin. In 2013, Vitalik Buterin, the creator of the cryptocurrency Ethereum, attended the 2013 PorcFest along with Erik Voorhees, an early embracer of Bitcoin and a member of the Free State Project. A 2011 episode of Planet Money discussed the prevalence of forges at the festival for the purposes of working precious metals (silver in the case of the episode) into smaller units for sales transactions.

The event in 2020, held during the COVID-19 pandemic, attracted over 1,000 attendees. Jeffrey Tucker of the American Institute for Economic Research gave a presentation at the festival wherein he argued against the COVID-19 lockdowns.

The event in 2021, for the first time since 2004, was a sold out event. It sold out again in 2022.
