= Islamic Organisation for Food Security =

Specialised institution of the Organisation of Islamic Cooperation

- Arabic: المنظمة الإسلامية للأمن الغذائي; French: Organisation islamique pour la sécurité alimentaire
- Abbreviation: IOFS
- Formation: 9 December 2013; 12 years ago
- Founded at: Conakry, Guinea
- Type: Food and agriculture organization
- Legal status: International Organization
- Purpose: Food security, agriculture, rural development, deforestation, desertification
- Location: Astana, Kazakhstan
- Services: Humanitarian aid
- Fields: Agriculture
- Members: 42 member states
- Official language: Arabic, English, French
- Director General: Berik Aryn
- Main organ: Organisation of Islamic Cooperation

Islamic Organisation for Food Security (IOFS; Arabic: المنظمة الإسلامية للأمن الغذائي; French: Organisation islamique pour la sécurité alimentaire), is a food and agriculture organization and one of the eight specialized institutions of the Organisation of Islamic Cooperation focused on the development of agriculture and rural development with primary focus on widespread scarcity of food and food security of the member states. Its charter is formally signed by 41 member states out of 57 as of 2024. The associated member states work in collaboration with IOFS.

Established in 2012 by adopting a resolution in the 39th session of the OIC Council of Foreign Ministers in Pakistan, it actively collaborates with intergovernmental organization such as Economic Cooperation Organization to promote its ideology within the scope of the OIC'S guidelines outlined for the food security.

== History ==
Islamic Organisation for Food Security was established on 17 November 2012 by adopting a resolution in the 39th session of Council of Foreign Ministers hosted by the Republic of Djibouti between 15 and 17 November 2012. However, it became a specialized institution of the OIC after adopting a resolution in the 40th session of the Council of Foreign Ministers hosted between 9 and 11 December 2013 in Conakry, Guinea. It came into force on 19 February 2008 under Article 21 of the Statute, OIC and its Secretariat became operational on 1 March 2018.

The sessions of IOFS are hosted by the ministers of food, agriculture, environment, and water resources of the member states. They formulate action plans for food crises and security and development of agriculture. The Republic of Kazakhstan is a full-fledged member of the IOFC which also serves its headquarters in Astana.

By the decision of the 6th General Assembly, held in Doha on 3 October 2023, Kazakh diplomat Askar Mussinov was elected as Director General of IOFS, as of 1 January 2024.

After the passing of Ambassador Askar Mussinov in February 2024, the First Extraordinary Session of the IOFS General Assembly was held in April, where Kazakh diplomat Berik Aryn was elected Director General for the remaining term of office.

== Objectives ==
IOFS is objectively focused on the coordination, formulation, and implementation of agricultural policies to reduce food crises in its associated member states. It also conducts humanitarian assistance operations in the state of emergency. It also contribute in the field of desertification, information technology (IT), erosion, and deforestation in addition providing information concerning use of water resources. It also collaborate with other institutions to prevent spread of cross-species transmission, particularly border disease.

== Member states ==
1. Afghanistan
2. Bangladesh
3. Benin
4. Burkina Faso
5. Cameroon
6. Chad
7. Comoros
8. Ivory Coast
9. Djibouti
10. Egypt
11. Gabon
12. Gambia
13. Guinea
14. Guinea-Bissau
15. Iran
16. Iraq
17. Jordan
18. Kazakhstan
19. Kuwait
20. Libya
21. Mali
22. Mauritania
23. Morocco
24. Mozambique
25. Niger
26. Nigeria
27. Pakistan
28. Palestine
29. Qatar
30. Saudi Arabia
31. Senegal
32. Sierra Leone
33. Somalia
34. Sudan
35. Suriname
36. Tajikistan
37. Tunisia
38. Turkey
39. Turkmenistan (observer)
40. Uganda
41. United Arab Emirates
42. Yemen

== See also ==
- World Food Programme
- International Fund for Agricultural Development
- Food and Agriculture Organization
- Organisation of Islamic Cooperation
- Economy of the Organisation of Islamic Cooperation
- COMSTECH
- Islamic World Educational, Scientific and Cultural Organization
- Islamic Development Bank
- Union of OIC News Agencies
- Islamic Committee of the International Crescent
- Women Development Organization
