= Kuman Tastanbekov =

Kuman Nurmakhanuly Tastanbekov
- Born: 10 March 1945; Kazakh USSR Almaty Region Sarkand District
- Died: 17 December 2017 (aged 72); Kazakhstan Almaty
- Occupations: Actor, entrepreneur
- Years active: 1969–2017
- Spouse: Meruert Utekeshova
- Awards: Order of Parasat Order of Kurmet

Kuman Nurmakhanuly Tastanbekov (Kazakh: Құман Нұрмаханұлы Тастанбеков, Qūman Nūrmahanūly Tastanbekov; 10 March 1945 Kazakh USSR Almaty Region Sarkand District - 17 December 2017 Kazakhstan Almaty) was a Kazakh actor. He was the holder of the Lenin Komsomol Prize in Kazakhstan (1976). He worked for the Kazakh State Academic Drama Theater since 1969.

== Early career ==
- In 1969, he graduated from the acting department of the Kurmangazy Kazakh National Conservatory, studying with Khadisha Bukeyev.

== Filmography ==
His first role was Tolegen in the movie Kyz Zhibek. Then

- Winter – Anxious Season
- My brother is mine
- Special day
- Swans fly
- The Echo of Love"
- Bride on the bride
- When the Goose Returns November
- Provincial Story
- End of the platform
- Expression
- She is on stage
- Kassym, Kulbek (Ch. Aitmatov "Mother – Earth – Mother" and "White Ship")
  - Alibek, Narsha, Abyz (M.Auezov, Aiman-Sholpan, Karaagoz and Enlik-Kebek)
- Tanirbergen (A. Nurpeisov, "The blood and the throat")
- Jean (O. Bokeev, "My Soul", Kazakhstan's Lenin Komsomol Prize, 1976)
- Aidar (Auezov and LS Sobolev, "Abai")
- Mazdak (M. Shakhanov, "The Kingdom of Faith")
- Orest (L. Durock, "Electra, My Sweetheart")
- Floridore (F.Erve, "Fox Violet")
- Farkhad (Nazim Hikmet, "Farkhad – Shirin"), etc. as well as performing various roles and behaviors.

== Awards ==
- 1976 Laureate of the Lenin Komsomol Prize in Kazakhstan
- 1982 Honored Artist of Kazakhstan, Honored Artist of the Kazakh SSR
- 1993 People's Artist of the Republic of Kazakhstan
- 2001 10 years of Independence of the Republic of Kazakhstan
- 2008, Order of Kurmet
- 2015 20 years to the Constitution of the Republic of Kazakhstan
- 2016 Parasat's Order
- 2016 25 years of Independence of Kazakhstan
