= Free State Project =

Libertarian political migration

Coordinates: 42.9897°N 71.4634°W

- Formation: September 1, 2001; 25 years ago
- Headquarters: 373 South Willow St #161, Manchester, New Hampshire, U.S.
- Executive Director: Eric Brakey
- Website: fsp.org

The Free State Project (FSP) is an American political migration movement founded in 2001 by Jason Sorens. In his original article "Announcement: The Free State Project," published in The Libertarian Enterprise (issue #131, "Let's Secede!"), the declared purpose of the movement was to form an independent libertarian nation, or failing that, to gain concessions from the federal government of the United States. By Sorens' calculations, a migration of 20,000 libertarians to a single low-population state would be sufficient to transform the state into a libertarian utopia. Another article by Sorens published in the next issue of The Libertarian Enterprise (#132, August 1, 2001) backed away somewhat from the urgency of secession, though taking over the state government remained its stated priority. New Hampshire was selected in 2003 for this purpose.

Participants in the FSP signed a statement of intent declaring that they intended to move to New Hampshire within five years of the drive reaching 20,000 participants. The statement of intent was intended to function as a form of assurance contract. As of February 3, 2016, 20,000 people had signed this statement of intent, completing the original goal, and 1,909 people were listed as "early movers" to New Hampshire on the FSP website, saying they had made their move prior to the 20,000-participant trigger. In the 2017–2018 term of the 400-member New Hampshire House of Representatives, 17 seats were held by Free Staters.

As of May 2022, approximately 6,232 participants have moved to New Hampshire for the Free State Project.

Eric Brakey is the executive director of the FSP as of 2024.

== Intent ==
The FSP mission statement, adopted in 2005, states:

The Free State Project is an agreement among 20,000 pro-liberty activists to move to New Hampshire, where they will exert the fullest practical effort toward the creation of a society in which the maximum role of government is the protection of life, liberty, and property. The success of the Project would likely entail reductions in taxation and regulation, reforms at all levels of government to expand individual rights and free markets, and a restoration of constitutional federalism, demonstrating the benefits of liberty to the rest of the nation and the world.

"Life, liberty, and property" are rights that were enumerated in the October 1774 Declaration and Resolves of the First Continental Congress and in Article 12 of the New Hampshire Constitution.

To become a participant of the Free State Project, a person is asked to agree to the Statement of Intent (SOI):

I hereby state my solemn intent to move to the State of New Hampshire within 5 years after 20,000 Participants have signed up. Once there, I will exert the fullest practical effort toward the creation of a society in which the maximum role of civil government is the protection of individuals' life, liberty, and property.

The FSP is open to people with a minimum age of 18. United States citizenship is not required. People who promote violence, racial hatred, or bigotry are not welcome in the FSP.

== History ==
The Free State Project was founded in 2001 by Jason Sorens, then a Ph.D. student at Yale University. Sorens published an article in The Libertarian Enterprise highlighting the failure of libertarians to elect any candidate to federal office and outlining his ideas for a secessionist movement, calling people to respond to him with interest. Sorens soon published a follow-up article noting that he had gotten about 200 responses to his initial article; given the hesitation of many respondents, Sorens backed away from secession somewhat, "and it never played a role in the FSP’s philosophy from then on." Secession from the United States, however, remains an issue for many Free Staters, including former FSP executive director Carla Gericke, who in 2026 formed a movement called NH Exit Now advocating New Hampshire's secession. The site claims that, in 2022, 42% of New Hampshire voters favored a ballot referendum on secession.

Sorens has stated that the movement continues an American tradition of political migration, which includes groups such as Mormon settlers in Utah, Amish religious communities, and the "Jamestown Seventy", an earlier effort to influence the politics of a particular state through deliberate migration.

The organization began without a specific state in mind. A systematic review started by narrowing potential states to those with a population of less than 1.5 million, and those where the combined spending in 2000 by the Democratic and Republican parties was less than the total national spending by the Libertarian Party in that year, $5.2 million. Hawaii and Rhode Island were eliminated from this list because of their propensity for centralized government.

In September 2003, a vote was held, and participants voted using the minimax Condorcet method to choose the state that they were to move to. New Hampshire was the winner, with Wyoming coming in second by a 57% to 43% margin. Alaska, Delaware, Idaho, Maine, Montana, North Dakota, South Dakota and Vermont were also on the list. Organizers selected New Hampshire based on its existing political climate and cultural alignment with libertarianism.

=== Free Staters Form NH Liberty Alliance PAC ===
On November 1, 2003, one month after choosing New Hampshire, 40 Free State members organized the New Hampshire Liberty Alliance PAC. The PAC's political role was to "score legislators on how liberty minded they are and make the results public."

As of June 2026, most Republicans in the New Hampshire legislature voted in alignment with the NH Liberty Alliance's 'Gold Standard' ratings of bills. One hundred twenty-four Democrats were ranked "Constitutional Threat" by the organization because they rarely or never voted in alignment with the NHLA agenda.

=== Free Town Project ===
In 2004, following the selection of New Hampshire, a splinter group called the Free Town Project formed to move to the small town of Grafton and advocate for legal changes there. Grafton's appeal as a favorable destination was due to its absence of zoning laws and a very low property tax rate. Additionally, it was the home of John Babiarz, a prominent member of the Libertarian Party who had twice run for Governor. Though no records were kept of the number of Free Town Project participants who moved to Grafton, the town's population grew from 1,138 in 2000 to 1,340 in 2010. Nearly all of the newcomers were men. Project participants fashioned homes out of yurts, recreational vehicles, trailers, tents, and shipping containers. The changes they voted in included a 30% reduction in the town's already-small budget, denying funding to the county's senior-citizens council. The libertarian newcomers additionally increased the town's costs by filing lawsuits against it in an attempt to set legal precedents.

In 2004, after the Free Town Project became active in Grafton County, there were three bear attacks. This led Matt Hongoltz-Hetling to write a book connecting the libertarian presence in Grafton to an increase in bear activity. In 2023, New Hampshire Fish and Game's bear biologist, Andrew Timmins, stated, "There's nothing to suggest that the population of bears in Grafton during that time period spiked or that people were having some sudden increase of conflicts with bears." He also confirmed that there was no correlation between the Free Town Project and bears.

The Free Town Project attracted significant attention from the media after cutting police, road, and fire services, camping in "non-traditional housing" in the woods, and attempting to pass measures to withdraw from the local school district and declare the town a "United Nations free zone". It also saw an increase in crime, the first two murders in the town's history, and an increase in sex offenders living in town.

In 2005, members of the Free Town Project were also briefly involved with Mentone, Texas. Mentone is in Loving County, at the time the least populous county in the United States. Three men, Lawrence Pendarvis, Bobby Emory, and Don Duncan, claimed to have bought 126 acres (51 ha) of land and registered to vote there, although the sheriff determined that the land was not sold to the group, as no deed had been filed at the county courthouse. He contacted the sellers, who said that the land had been sold to other buyers, after which the sheriff filed misdemeanor charges against the three men and threatened to arrest them if they returned.

On February 3, 2016, the Free State Project announced via social media that 20,000 people had signed the Statement of Intent. In a press conference later that day, then FSP president Carla Gericke officially announced that the move had been triggered and that signers were expected to follow up on their pledge. This concluded the Free Town Project, and the Free State Project organization changed focus from recruiting signers to encouraging them to move to New Hampshire, stating "we want 20,000 movers".

== Electoral activity ==
The Free State Project is not officially aligned with a political party and as a 501(c)(3) educational non-profit cannot advocate for particular candidates or votes on ballot issues. However, given its founding purpose of "taking over the [state] government," within a month of choosing New Hampshire as its target for migration and libertarian transformation, the organization formed the NH Liberty Alliance, a 501(c)(4) non-profit for political advocacy. Staffed with volunteers aligned with the Free State Project, the NH Liberty Alliance sends a weekly "Gold Standard" advisory to NH legislators on upcoming votes, and at year-end issues a "Liberty Rating" of all legislators based on how well each aligns with its dictates. However, Republican legislators typically earn its highest ratings (on an A+ to F grading scale), while no Democrats in its 2026 annual Liberty Rating earned a score higher than D-, and over 70% were rated worse than F, which is "Constitutional Threat".

The Free State Project is defined as a movement that seeks to relocate people of broadly libertarian ideals to New Hampshire, specifically for the purpose of converting it to a libertarian utopia. It receives its funding from individual donors interested in moving as part of the FSP or in attending one of their annual events. The FSP registered as a tax-exempt nonprofit educational organization under category 501(c)(3), on July 9, 2009 which makes donations to it potentially tax-deductible.

Several early movers have been elected to the 400-member New Hampshire House of Representatives. In 2006, Joel Winters became the first known Free Stater to be elected, running as a Democrat. He was re-elected in 2008 but defeated in 2010. In 2010, 12 Free Staters were elected to the New Hampshire House of Representatives, all of them as Republicans. In 2012, 11 more were elected. In 2012, elected participants wrote and passed House Bill 418 which would require state agencies to consider open source software and data formats when making acquisitions; however, the bill died in the State Senate.

In 2014, 17 Free Staters were elected. In 2016, 15 of 32 Free Stater candidates were elected. In 2017, there were 17 Free Staters in the New Hampshire House of Representatives, and, in 2021, the New Hampshire Liberty Alliance, which ranks bills and elected representatives based on their adherence to what they see as libertarian principles, scored 150 representatives as "A−" or above rated representatives.

For the legislative year ended in 2026, a total of 134 -- or 61.8% of the 217 Republican representatives -- were given a Liberty Rating of A- or higher; 182 (83.9%) were rated B- or higher. None of the 178 Democratic lawmakers were rated higher than a D-; 70.8% were rated "Constitutional Threats." The rationale for the Constitutional Threat rating is that the NH Liberty Alliance deems a legislator "unfaithful to their oath to uphold the New Hampshire Constitution and the principles of liberty," though recipients of the rating note that their offending votes were to limit toxic pollutants, protect bodily autonomy and due process, improve data privacy and other pro-community issues.

Participants of the FSP also engage with other like-minded activist groups such as Young Americans for Liberty and Americans for Prosperity.

In 2022, the Croydon school board president and her husband, members of the Free State Project, attempted to cut the school budget by half in a surprise but licit maneuver on the day of the vote, in a district with typically low attendance for votes. The plan that passed offered students online learning from a facilitator or $9,000 to go to an alternate public or private school. This plan was claimed to satisfy the requirement of New Hampshire's constitution to provide an adequate education. In response, local residents organized to overturn the budget. They needed more than half of the eligible voters to vote in a special town meeting, and a majority of those voters to vote for the fully-funded budget. The new school budget was overruled 377 to 2, with just under two-thirds of eligible voters voting, and the original budget was restored. (The lopsided vote was because the strategy of supporters of the change was to refrain from attending the meeting, to deny it a quorum.)

=== Annual events ===
The Free State Project organizes two annual events in New Hampshire:

- The New Hampshire Liberty Forum, a convention-style event with a wide variety of speakers, dinners and events.
- The Porcupine Freedom Festival, colloquially referred to as PorcFest, a weeklong summer festival that takes place at a campground. It was described by Libertarian philosophy professor Roderick Long as, "like Woodstock for rational people".

== Responses ==
=== Support ===
On February 17, 2006, economist Walter Block publicly expressed his support for the FSP and was quoted as saying:

You people are doing the Lord's work. The FSP is one of the freshest practical ideas for promoting liberty that has come out of the libertarian movement in the past few decades. May you succeed beyond your wildest dreams, and thus demonstrate in yet another empirical way the benefits and blessings of liberty.

Jeffrey Tucker reflected about his experiences at the New Hampshire Liberty Forum in Nashua, saying in part: "If you are willing to look past mainstream media coverage of American politics, you can actually find exciting and interesting activities taking place that rise above lobbying, voting, graft and corruption".

The project was endorsed by Ron Paul and Gary Johnson. In 2010, Lew Rockwell from the Mises Institute endorsed the project and referred to the city of Keene, New Hampshire as "the northern capital of libertarianism". In 2011, Peter Schiff said he had considered moving to NH at one point.

Some Republicans have responded more favorably to the project. In September 2014, Republican Party Senate nominee Scott Brown, a former United States Senator from Massachusetts, said his election campaign needed "Freestaters" to support him in his one-minute closing statement at the Granite State Debate.

Maine state senator Eric Brakey partially attributed the Republican Party's 2020 election gains to the Free State Project.

Young Americans For Liberty's Make Liberty Win PAC promised up to $500,000 "to protect the GOP's State House majority" in New Hampshire in 2026.

=== Criticism ===
Critics argue that the Free State Project is "radical", a "fantasy", or that they "go too far" in seeking to restrict government. The project has drawn criticism from some New Hampshire residents concerned about population pressure and opposition to taxpayer-supported public services.

In 2012, the Concord Police Department applied for $258,000 in federal government funding to buy a Lenco BearCat armored vehicle for protection against terrorist attacks, riots, or shooting incidents. The application mentioned "Free Staters" alongside Sovereign Citizens and Occupy New Hampshire as groups that "are active and present daily challenges". The grant from the United States Department of Homeland Security was successful, but the Concord City Council revised the application to remove references to those political movements before unanimously approving of the grant.

A 2022 survey found relatively little awareness of the Free State Project in New Hampshire but generally negative opinions among those familiar: 49% of respondents had heard of the project, while 10% expressed a favorable view and 26% an unfavorable one.

In March 2026, about 100 members of nonprofits including the Kent Street Coalition, 50501 NH, Southern NH Indivisible, Granite State Matters, and Third Act NH rallied in front of the NH State House against the Free State Project's agenda.

=== Media coverage ===
The Free State Project was the centerpiece of the 2011 documentary film Libertopia as well as the 2014 crowdfunded documentary 101 Reasons: Liberty Lives in New Hampshire.

In 2023, NBC Boston produced and released a docu-series about the Free State Project titled Life, Liberty and the Pursuit of New Hampshire, which includes interviews from members, supporters, and critics of the Free State Project.

== See also ==
- Adelsverein
- American Redoubt
- Anarcho-capitalism
- Foot voting
- Free West Alliance
- Freedom Cities
- Fusionism
- Jason Sorens
- Libertarian conservatism
- Libertarian Republican
- Libertarian Party of New Hampshire
- Libertarianism in the United States
- New Hampshire Liberty Alliance
- Night-watchman state
- Objectivism
- Paleolibertarianism
- Politics of New Hampshire
- Right-libertarianism
- Voluntaryism
