= Free West Alliance =

American libertarian organization

The Free West Alliance (FWA) was an organization attempting to organize the migration of libertarians and the like-minded into the U.S. states of Idaho, Montana and Wyoming, in order to influence local political policy toward libertarian ideals. It also sought to mobilize residents of the states who had libertarian politics.

== History ==
FWA was created shortly after the selection of the state of New Hampshire by an earlier American political migration movement, the Free State Project (FSP). FWA founders were predominantly either former members of FSP who had "opted out" of New Hampshire in that organization's state selection process, or others who had associated with FSP but not signed up.

The reasons for the creation of FWA are many, most prominent being the dissatisfaction many westerners felt over the selection of an eastern state, for geographical reasons and for the cultural split that became evident in the Free State Project discussion forums between "westerners" and "easterners". Note, some in the "western" faction actually lived in the east, and vice versa.

The Free West Alliance was associated to some degree with similar Canadian movements, and with the Free State Wyoming (FSW).

The Montana and Wyoming branches of FWA were the most active. Evidence of prior, small freedom migration movements to Wyoming turned up in discussions on the various email lists associated with FWA. Montana and Wyoming are often viewed as states with strong anti-authoritarian traditions, and have a history of informal individual migrations for that purpose.

== See also ==
- Free State Project
