= Order of Parasat =

- The medal of the Order of Parasat
- Type: Civil order
- Awarded for: Merit in the fields of science, culture, literature and art, as well as statesmen and public figures, defenders of human rights, and others who have contributed to the spiritual or intellectual potential of Kazakhstan.
- Country: Kazakhstan
- Eligibility: Notable figures
- Established: 1993
- Ribbon bar of the order

Precedence
- Next (higher): Order of Valor
- Next (lower): Order of Kurmet

The Order of Parasat (Kazakh: Парасат ордені, Parasat ordeni; the Order of Nobility) is an order awarded by the government of Kazakhstan. It was established in 1993.

The order is awarded to notable figures in the fields of science, culture, literature and art, as well as statesmen and public figures, defenders of human rights, and others who have contributed to the spiritual or intellectual potential of Kazakhstan.

== Notable recipients ==
- Nagima Aitkhozhina (2001), Kazakh molecular biologist
- Ashimjan Akhmetov (2008), scientist, lawyer, engineer, and politician
- Viktor Chernomyrdin (1999), for his contribution to the development of oil and gas industry in Kazakhstan, Gazprom
- Dinmukhamet Idrisov (2011), Kazakhstani businessman, economist and diplomat
- Pyotr Klimuk (1995), former cosmonaut
- Yuri Koptev, commander of Russian Space Forces
- Ondasyn Orazalin (2014), Deputy Chief of Staff of Kazakhstan
- Valeri Polyakov (1999), former cosmonaut
- Emomali Rahmon (2018), President of Tajikistan
- Roza Rymbayeva (2000), Soviet and Kazakh singer
- Yesken Sergebayev (2008), sculptor
- Umut Shayakhmetova (2011), financier
- Umirzak Shukeyev (1998), Deputy Prime Minister in the Government of Kazakhstan
- Kuman Tastanbekov (2016), Kazakh actor during the Soviet period
- Kassym-Jomart Tokayev (1996) President of Kazakhstan
- Alla Vazhenina, Russian weightlifter competing for Kazakhstan

== See also ==
- Orders, decorations, and medals of Kazakhstan
