= Jason Sorens =

American political scientist

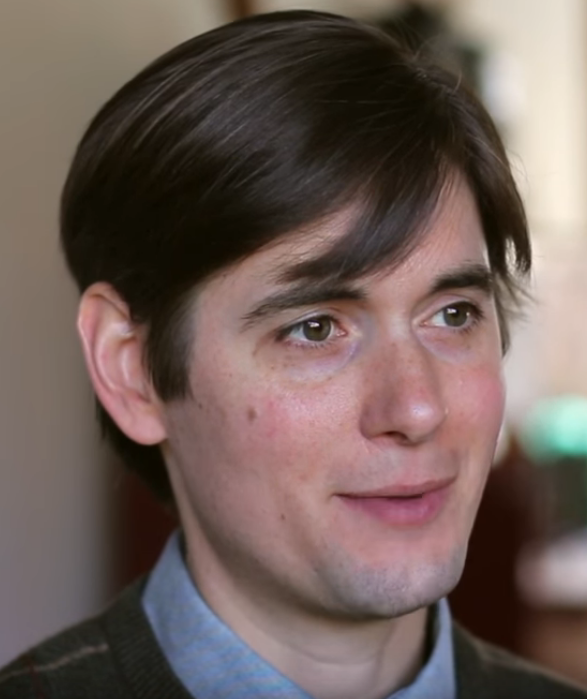
- Photo courtesy Free State Project
- Born: Houston, Texas, U.S.
- Education: Yale University, PhD political science Washington and Lee University, BA in economics and philosophy
- Occupations: Professor and author
- Website: freestateproject.org

Jason Sorens is an American political scientist and a conservative libertarian activist. He founded the Free State Project in 2001.

== Personal life ==
Sorens lives in Amherst, New Hampshire with his wife Olga and their children.

== Career ==
Sorens received his B.A. in economics and philosophy, with honors, from Washington and Lee University and his PhD in political science from Yale University.

Sorens is a Senior Research Fellow at the American Institute for Economic Research (AIER), a conservative libertarian think-tank. Previously, Sorens was the director of the Center for Ethics in Society at St. Anselm College and prior to that he was a lecturer in the department of government at Dartmouth College. He has been an affiliated scholar with the Mercatus Center at George Mason University since 2008. His primary research interests include fiscal federalism, public policy in federal systems, secessionism, and ethnic politics.

Sorens' book Secessionism: Identity, Interest, and Strategy was published by McGill-Queen's University Press in 2012.

He is president and co-founder of the Ethics and Economics Education of New England (E3NE), a libertarian education non-profit.

=== Free State Project ===
In July 2001, Sorens published an essay titled "Announcement: The Free State Project", in which he proposed the idea of a political migration, with 20,000 libertarians to move to a single low-population state (New Hampshire, selected in 2003) to make the state a stronghold for libertarian ideas.

As of November 26, 2021, over 20,000 people had signed this statement of intent—completing the original goal—with 5,223 people listed as "movers" to New Hampshire on the FSP website, saying they had already moved to New Hampshire as part of the 20,000+-participant trigger. As of May 2022, approximately 6,232 participants have moved to New Hampshire for the Free State Project.

== See also ==
- Free State Project
- New Hampshire Liberty Alliance
- New Hampshire Liberty Forum
- Porcupine Freedom Festival
