= Yesken Sergebayev =

Soviet and Kazakh sculptor

- Born: 19 May 1940 (age 86); Almaty, Soviet Union (now Kazakhstan)
- Known for: Sculptor
- Notable work: Mukhtar Auezov monument in front of Kazakh Drama Theatre in Almaty, Kazakhstan; Abu- Nasr Al- Farabi monument in front of Kazakh National State University named after Al- Farabi, etc.
- Style: Monumental sculptor, Easel sculpture
- Movement: Social realism, Realism
- Spouse: Akilova Asiya Yusupbayevna
- Awards: The Order of Nobility 'Parasat'

Yesken Amanzholovich Sergebayev (born 19 May 1940 in Almaty, KazSSR)- is a prominent Soviet and Kazakh sculptor, former Dean of Paintings and Sculptor Faculty, currently he is the Professor and Head of Sculptor Department of Kazakh National Academy of Arts named after T.Zhurgenov.

In 1982 Yesken Sergebayev got The State Prize for the monument of Mukhtar Auezov.

In 1983 Yesken Sergebayev got The Honored Art Worker State Prize.

In 2008 Yesken Sergebayev got The Order of Nobility (Order of Parasat) as a notable figure in the arts field of Kazakhstan.

== Early life ==
Born on 19 May 1940, in Almaty I. When he was born, his father was 55 and his mother was 45. And Yessken Sergebayev was the only child in family. Following statement is an extract from the interview with Yesken Sergebayev: ‘My father was a shepherd, the very first year when the WWII started we’ve moved to the outskirts of Almaty, in a small village called Ali. Devastating poverty during and after the WWII years affected my creativity for constructing my own toys out of mud and clay, which I was extracting from the neighboring lake called Karasu (Karasu means ‘black water’ due to special mud at the bottom of the lake). Then I’d ask my mother to help with the drying process of my toys I’ve created out of mud and clay’ Yesken Sergebayev continues, ‘they were just the figures of cows, horses and people. After they were dried up, I proceeded with painting the toys with their eyes, etc. with the crayons called ‘Spartak’’.

After finishing the 7th grade of the elementary school, he wanted to continue studying in aviation institute in Aktobe, his dream was to become a pilot, which is the most common dream of the young boys at that age. His uncle Kadyrbek Zhunisbayev was the first person to recognize little Yesken’s sculpture and painter talents, so he advised his parents to submit the application into the local Arts School. ‘Uncle Kadyrbek affected further course of my life significantly’ Yesken Sergebayev says, ‘he was a head of the museum of Dzhambul Dzhabayev in Uzynagash village and this was actually the place where I first saw the workshop of well- known Kazakh sculpture Khakimzhan Nauryzbayev, I’ve been looking at his works from the outside and I was mesmerized. Up till that exact moment I didn’t even know what sculpture is, I knew nothing about such profession at all’. Studied sculpture in Almaty Arts School between 1955 and 1960. Showing an outstanding results during his studies in Arts School, he got the official direction to continue studies in Leningrad Academy of Arts named after Repin. He got enrolled to the Sculpture Department of the Academy of Arts in Leningrad in 1962, where he studied for the consecutive 7 years. Among famous artists working in the Academy back in the days, Yesken Sergebayev attended sculpture classes of the Professor Mikhail Anikushin.

While studying in the Academy of Arts in Leningrad, Yesken Sergebayev worked on restorations of following historical, cultural and architectural objects located in different parts of modern Saint- Petersburg:

- classical sculpture of Homer and et cetera in the National Library of Russia named after Saltykov- Shedrin;
- reliefs on the facade of the Admiralty Building;
- main hall of the Saint- Petersburg State University (Twelve Collegia building);
- Saint Petersburg Manege;
- Atlanteans of the Embassy of Italy building;
- Cross on the Savkino hill, Mikhailovskoye;
- poem of Pushkin engraving on one of the plates located in Mikhailovskoye

and so on.

He’s a current member of Arts Academy of the Republic of Kazakhstan, academician of the Kazakh National Academy of Arts named after T.Zhurgenov (2000). He was a professor of Alma-Aty Theatre and Arts school (1978–1993). Author of the methodical textbooks for students and the professors “Some features of teaching monument and sculpture specialization’, ‘Academic painting course in arts universities’.

Since 1960 he was a sculptor of the KazSSRs’ arts fund. In the year of 1969, after graduating from Leningrad Academy of Arts, Yesken Sergebayev returned to Almaty and started sculpture classes in Almaty Arts School. 1974- Senior sculptor of arts complex ‘Oner’. Since 1978- Professor, PhD of the Theatre and Arts school. Since 2010 till now he is a professor, PhD of the Kazakh National Academy named after T.Jurgenov.

Since 2009 co- founder of Almaty Union of Artists.

== Personal life ==
Spouse: Akilova Asiya Yusupbayevna, PhD of didactics science, professor of the Almaty Technological University.

Children: Sergebayev Arman Yeskenovich, Sergebayeva Ayana Yeskenovna, Cimmerman Leila Yeskenovna.

== Monumental works ==
=== Mukhtar Auezov monument ===
in 1978 contest for the installation of Mukhtar Auezov, a famous Kazakh writer, monument has been announced. Yesken Sergebayev took participation and won the contest in the year of 1979. The overall number of projects submitted to the contest was around 50. The contest went through several elimination stages. At each stage the jury of the contest had been eliminating up to ten works. ‘I myself have submitted 14 projects, out of which only the last one, the 14th one got approved by the jury’ Yesken Sergebayev is saying. The contest jury, numbering twenty people, included well- known Soviet artists, writers, poets such as Olzhas Suleimenov, for example, architects and sculptors as well as Ministry of Culture representatives. The monument had to be installed by the year of 1980, timelines were tight and pressure on meeting the deadlines was very high. But the author had to resist the high pressure and he took the required amount of time to go to Semey in order to visit Abai Kunanbayev places. Abai Kunanbayev is the well- known Kazakh poet and philosopher, he had become the central subject of two novels and an opera written by Mukhtar Auezov. Yesken Sergebayev became acquainted with the family members of Mukhtar Auezov, they had been providing all of the rare photographs and materials available, which Yesken Sergebayev utilized while working on the monument. ‘By the year of 1980 the monument was ready to be cast with bronze’ Yesken Sergebayev continues, ‘but due to the Olympic games that started in 1980, Moscow and Leningrad went to lockdown, which was because of pre-Olympic preparation works. Hence Moscow and Leningrad foundries were not reachable, so it was decided to proceed with the bronze casting in the foundry that was based in Baku, Azerbaidzhan, where the whole process took almost three months.’ The bronze casting process and its timelines were controlled by Dinmukhamed Kunayev, Geidar Aliyev, the First Secretary of the Communistic Party of Azerbaidzhan and Tahir Salakhov, famous painter from Azerbaidzhan, who was the First Secretary of the Union of Artists of the USSR. ‘Mukhtar Auezov monument, cast out of bronze, was shipped by the Caspian sea from Azerbaidzhan to Kazakhstan and the opening was planned on the 5th of October, 1980’ Yesken Sergebayev continues, ‘a day, prior to the official opening, I am getting a phone call from Kunayev administration, informing me that Kunayev can’t be present on the official opening, so we are now required to organize the technical opening at 10 AM, which was the only available timing when Kunayev can be present at the monument opening. Official opening was planned later on that day. I remember that after seeing the monument, Kunayev proclaimed ‘what an outstanding work but who is the author?’, then he shook my hand and told me that he appreciates the work that was done’. That is how Yesken Sergebayev was introduced to Dinmukhamed Kunayev, the First Secretary of the Communist Party of Kazakhstan, Full Member of Politburo of the Central Committee of the CPSU.

=== Abu Nasr Al- Farabi monument ===
On creation of Abu- Nasr Al- Farabi monument, Yesken Sergebayev is saying: 'Why not to make Abu Nasr Al- Farabi or Abylai Khan as our own national symbol? As an example, Uzbeks are proud of the fact that Al- Biruni and Avicenna were born on the territory of modern Uzbekistan. Then why not to install the monument of Al- Farabi, which was born on the territory of Turkistan city (previously called Otyrar, south of Kazakhstan)? There was a Soviet Union- wise big contest 43 years ago for Abu- Nasr Al- Farabi monument installation on the territory of modern Kazakhstan. I’ve prepared the project of Al- Farabi monument for the contest.’ But that contest had to be postponed due to China- Soviet Union border conflict on Damansky Island. USSR went into the pre-war preparation phase and there was an order to utilize all the bronze material in military purposes only and as a result Al- Farabi contest had to be postponed for 5-6 years. And then during Gorbachev times, with beginning of perestroika, Al- Farabi monument contest was forgotten. ‘My initial plan is to place the monument on the intersection of Al- Farabi and Dostyk prospects’ Yesken Sergebayev continues, ‘right in the heart of the city, couple of blocks away from Abay Kunanbayev statue, which I find very symbolical. According to the plan, behind the statue will be the 16 meters high arch, panels of the arch will depict greatest philosophers from Pythagoras and Al- Farabi up till Mukhtar Auezov. Height of the monument is proposed to be 8 meters. The monument of Abu Nasr Al- Farabi, the one that has been placed in front of the Kazakh National University named after Al- Farabi, is not a monument that has been requested by the governmental institutions, it was a private requisition to me from the University administration back in the days and which was sponsored by private funds.'

=== Nurgisa Tlendiyev monument ===
Monument of Kazakh famous conductor and composer Nurgisa Tlendiyev was placed in Dzhambul village, nearby the Museum of Dzhambul Dzhabayev.

=== Sultanmakhmut Toraigyrov monument ===
Monument of Sultanmakhmut Toraigyrov, Pavlodar:

=== Abul Khair Khan monument ===
Monument of Abulkhair- Khan in Aktobe:

=== 'Dos Mukasan' music band sculptural composition ===
Sculptural composition dedicated to Dos Mukasan music band in Pavlodar:

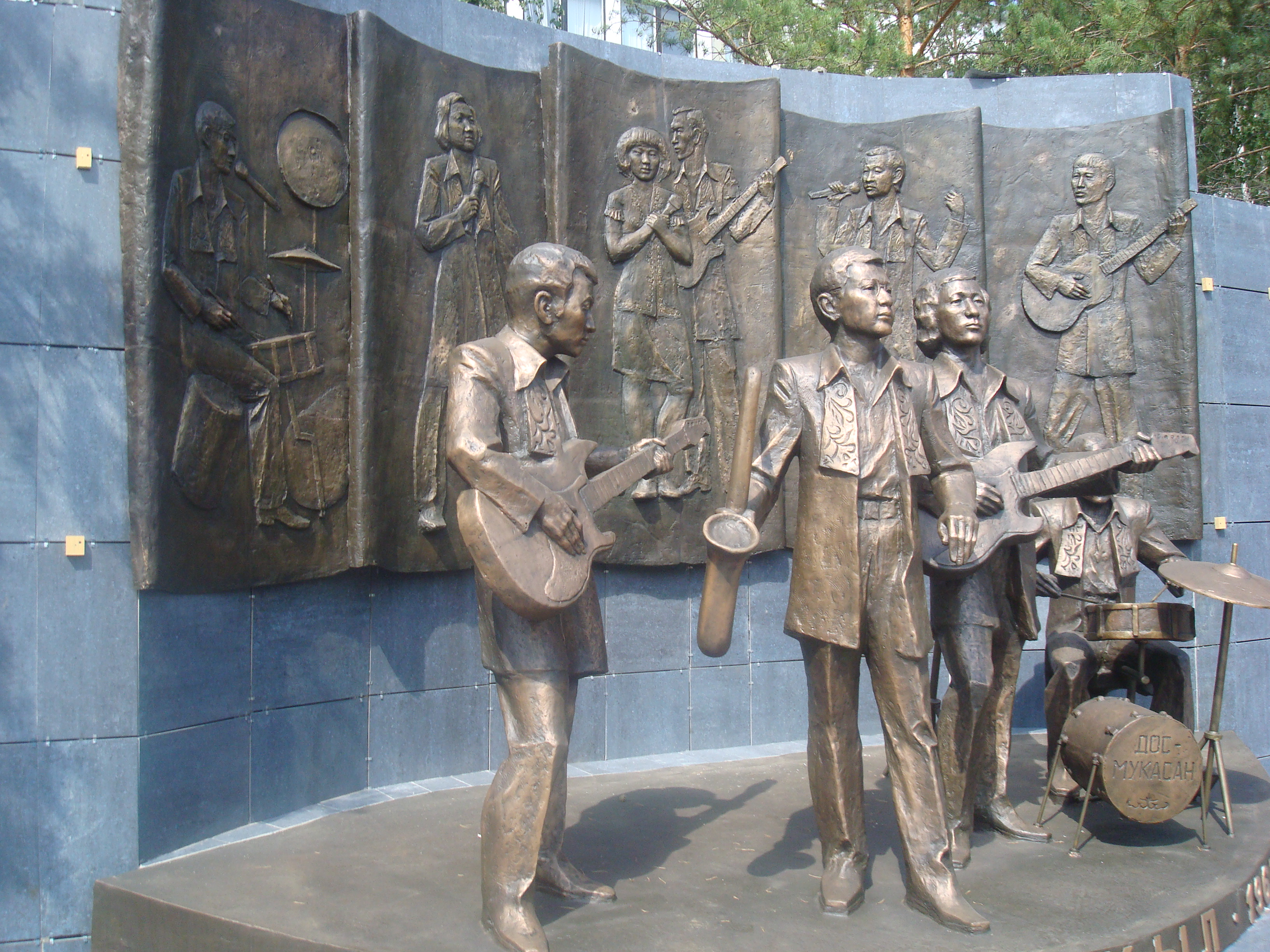
Sculptural composition of 'Dos Mukasan' music band

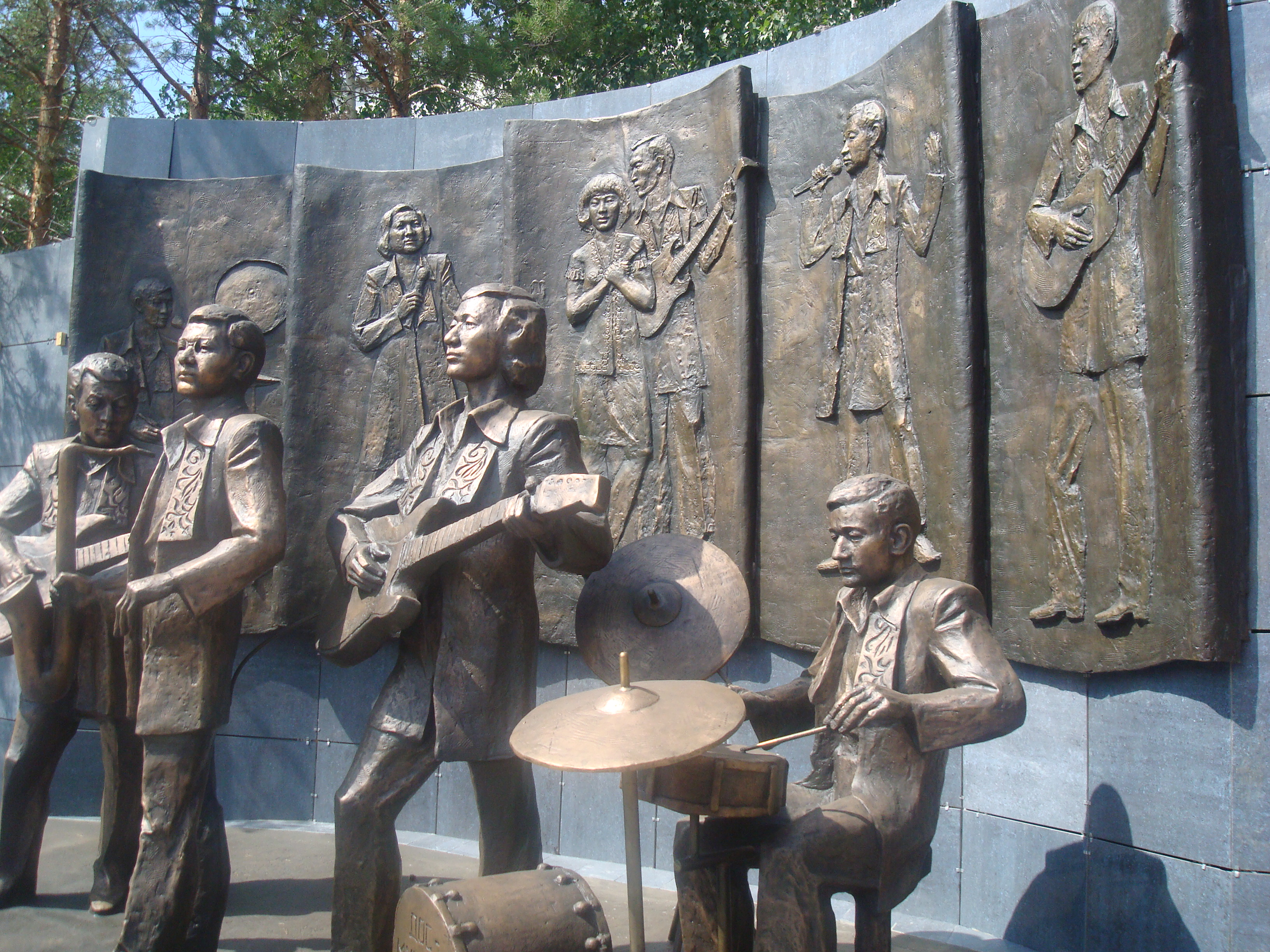
Sculptural composition of 'Dos Mukasan' music band

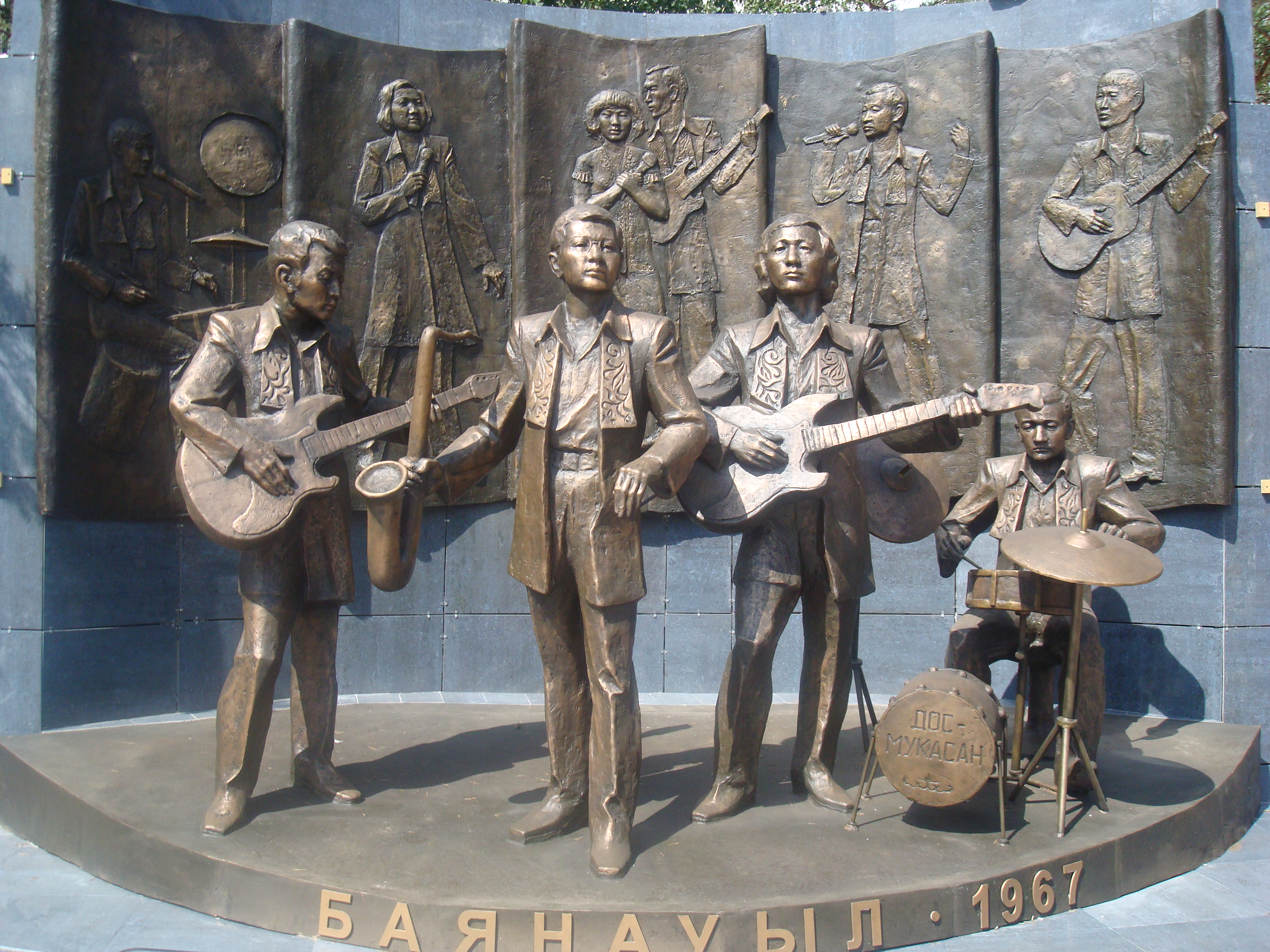
Sculptural composition of 'Dos Mukasan' music band

=== Abay Qunanbayuly monument ===
Monument of Kazakh poet, composer and philosopher Abay Qunanbayuli (Ust’-Kamenogorsk):

=== Akhmet Zhubanov monument ===
Monument of Akhmet Zhubanov in Aktobe:

=== Turar Zhurgenov monument ===
Temirbek Zhurgenov monument in front of Kazakh National Academy of Arts in Almaty, Kazakhstan:

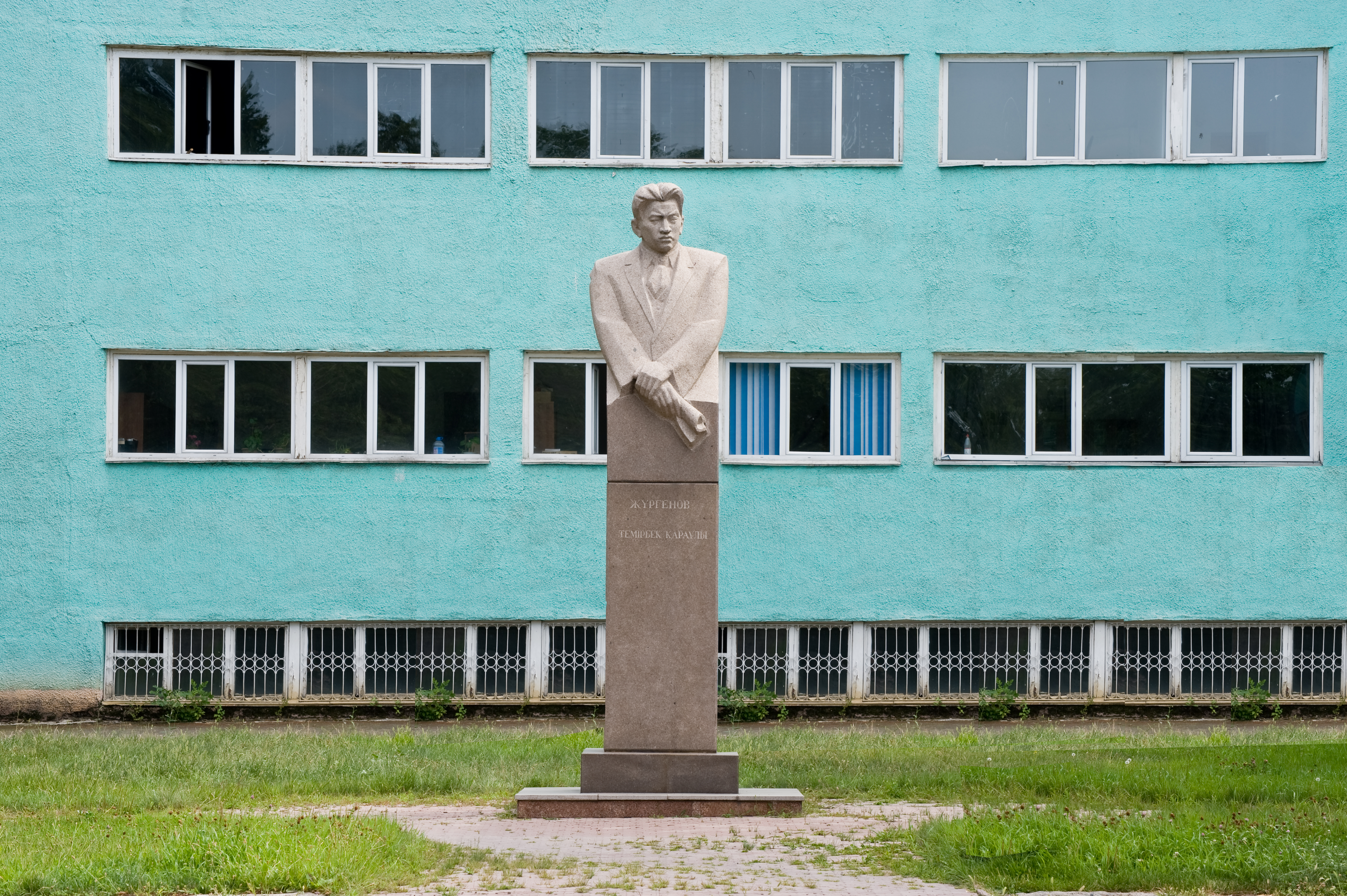
Temirbenk Zhurgenov monument in front of the Kazakh National Academy of Arts, Almaty, Kazakhstan

and many other monumental works and sculptures.

== Easel Sculpture Works ==
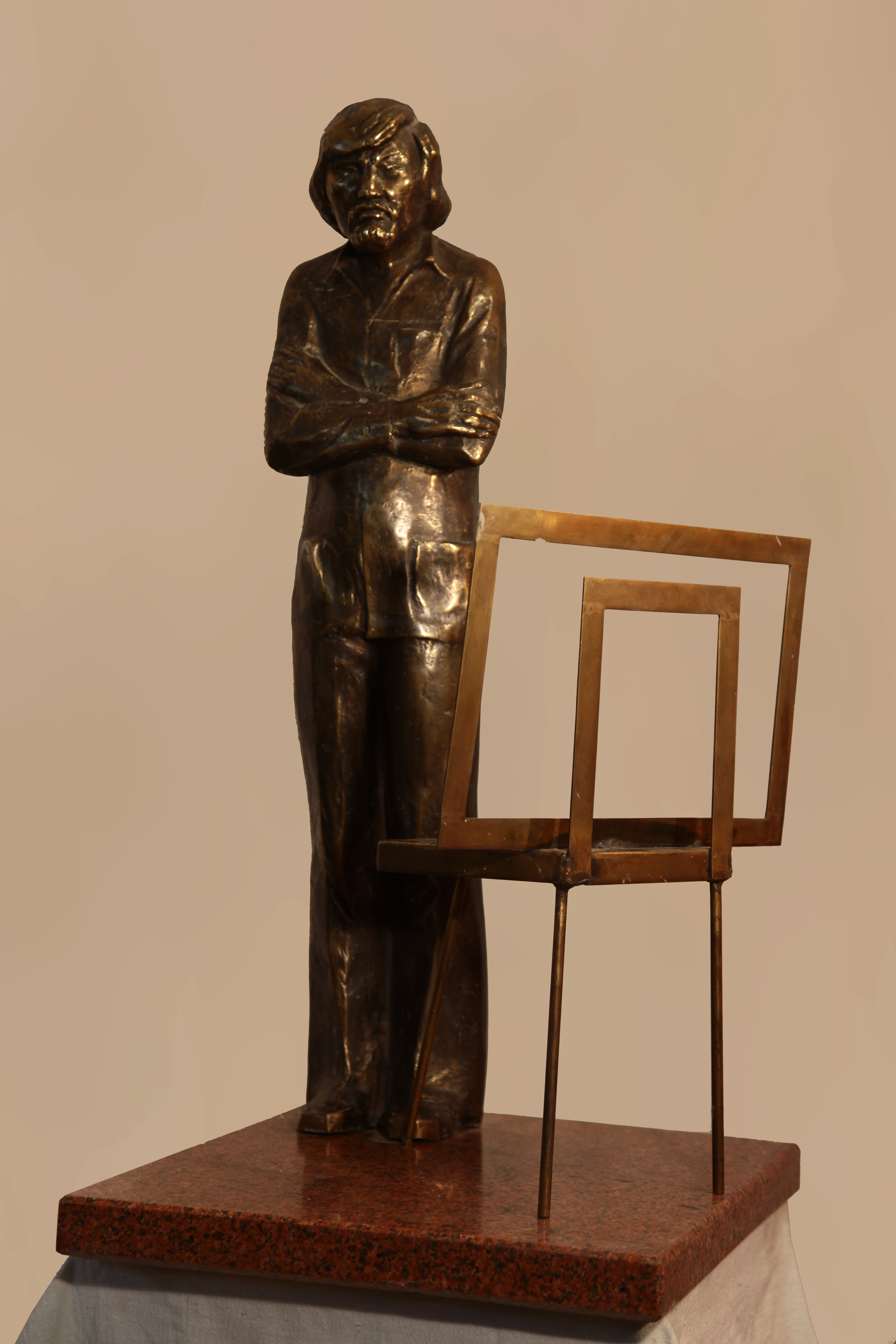
Salikhitdin Aitbayev. Easel sculpture. Material: bronze.

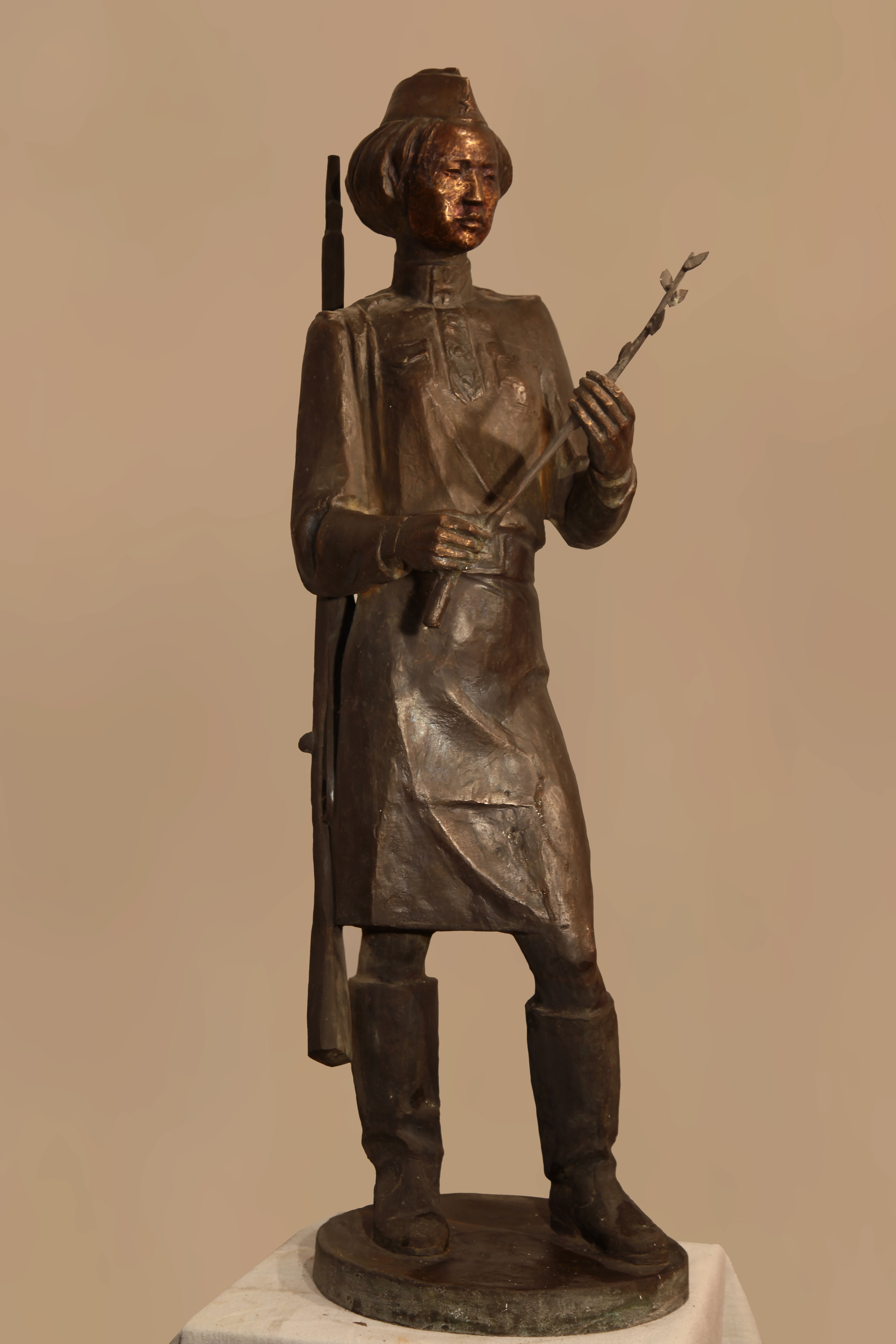
Aliya Moldagulova. Easel sculpture. Material: bronze.

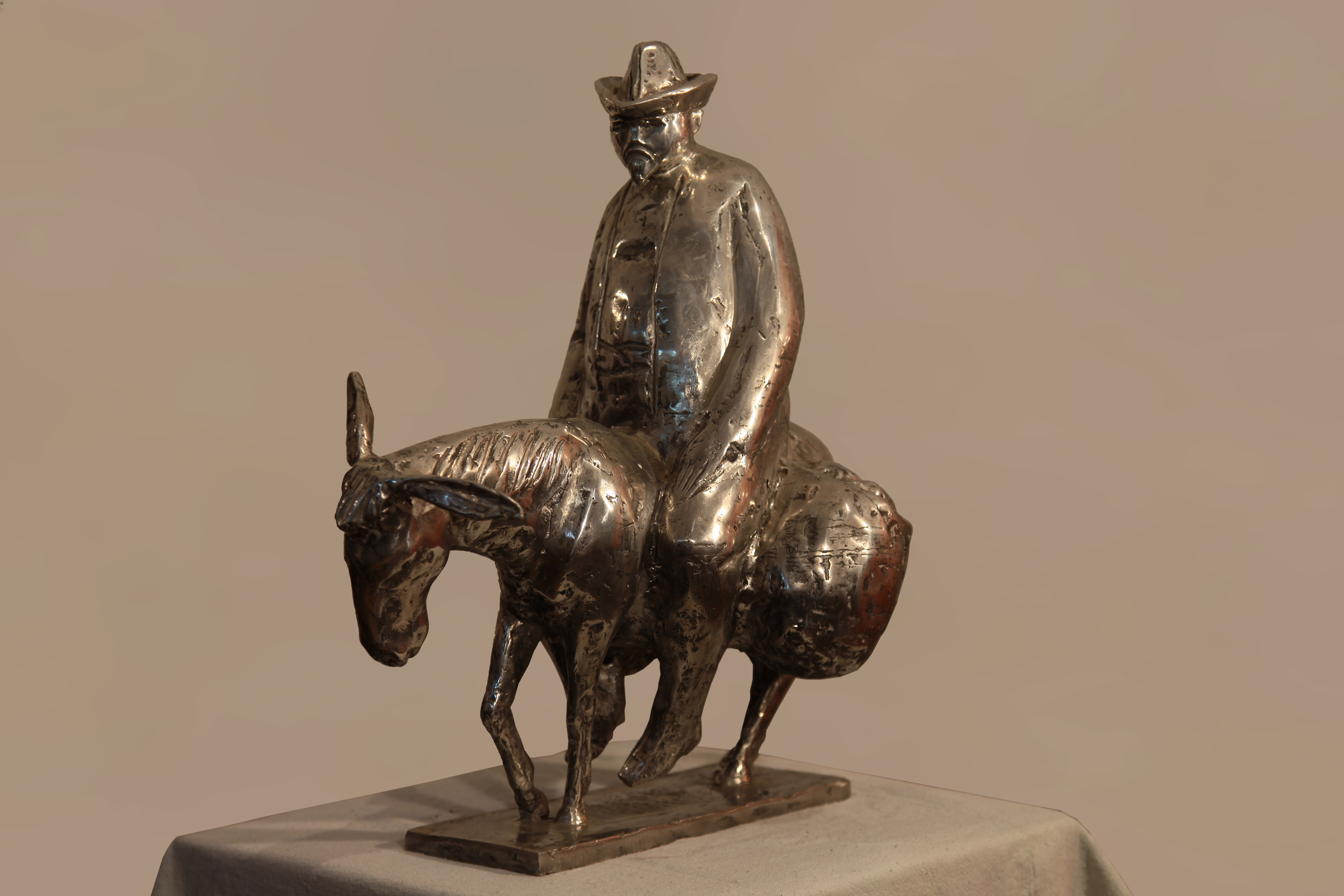
Father. Material: bronze.

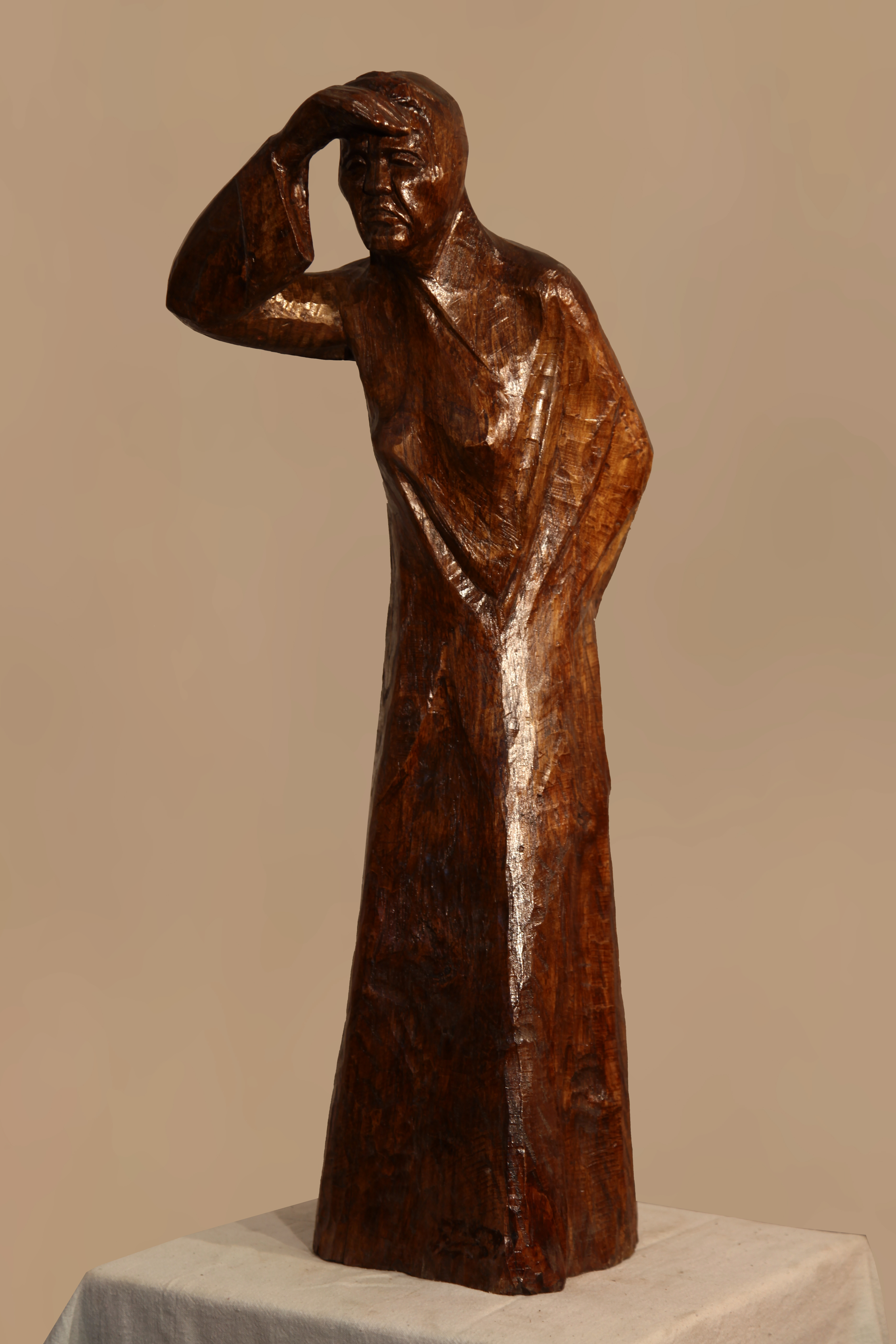
Mother.

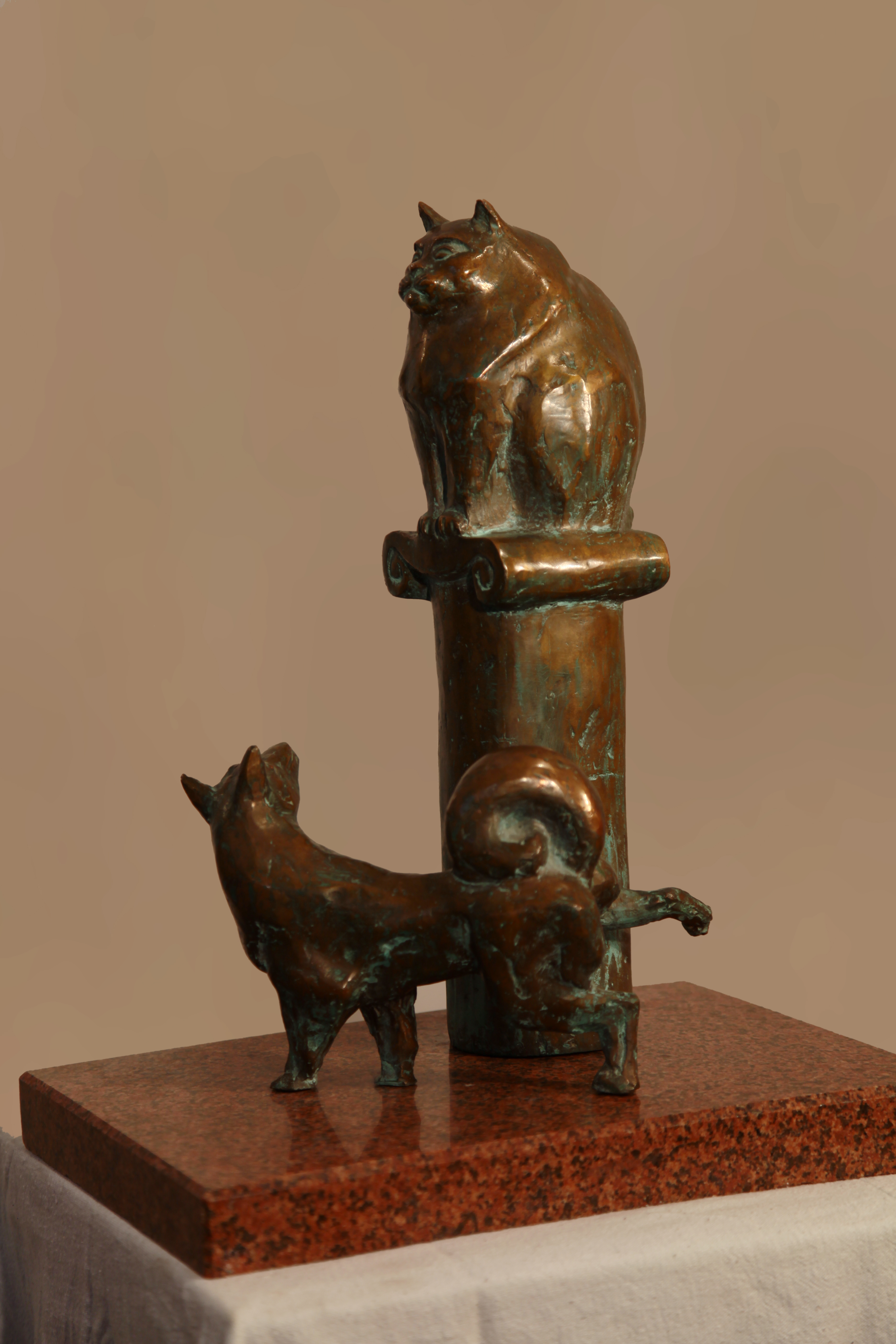
Confrontation. Material: bronze.

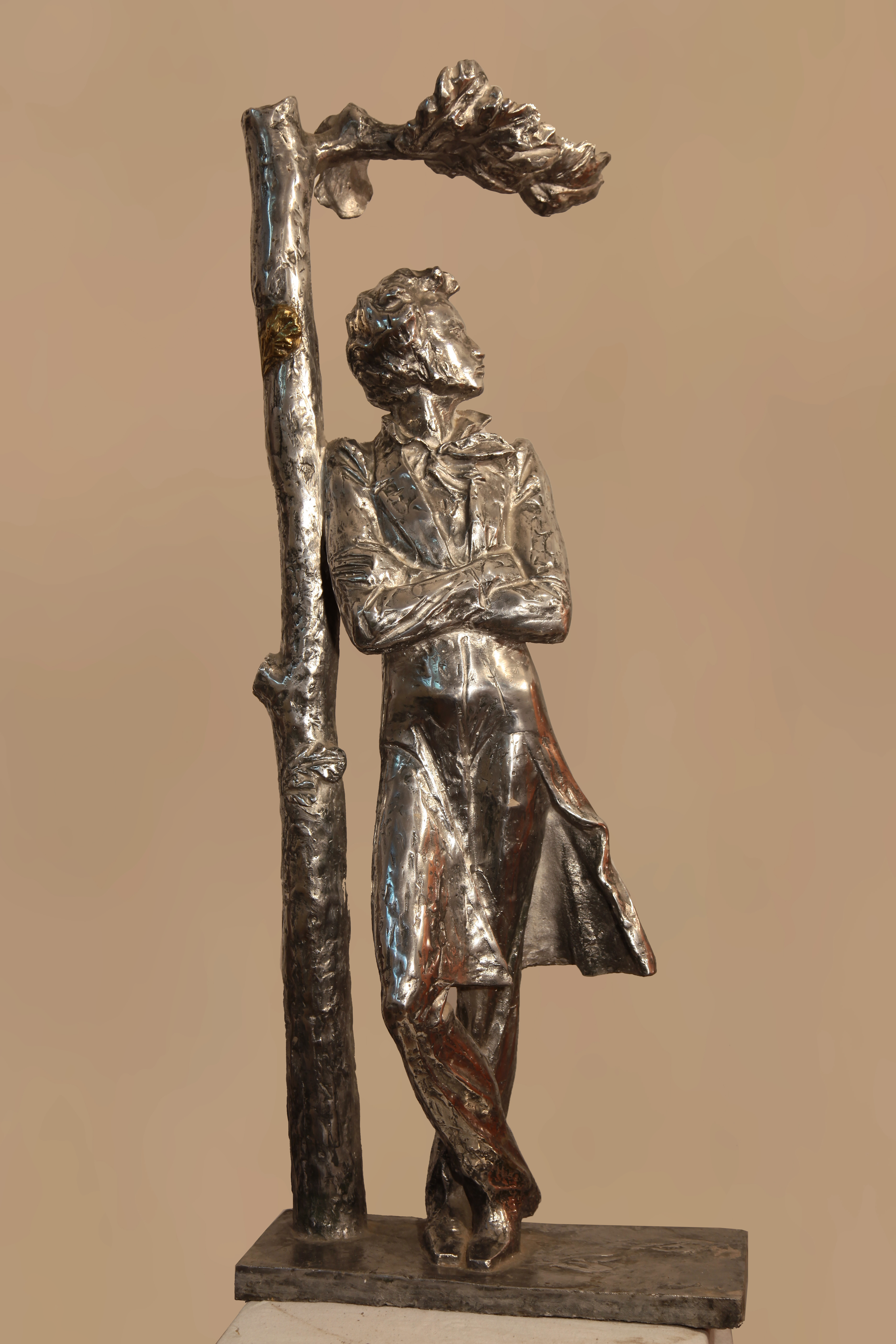
Alexander Pushkin. Easel sculpture. Material: bronze.

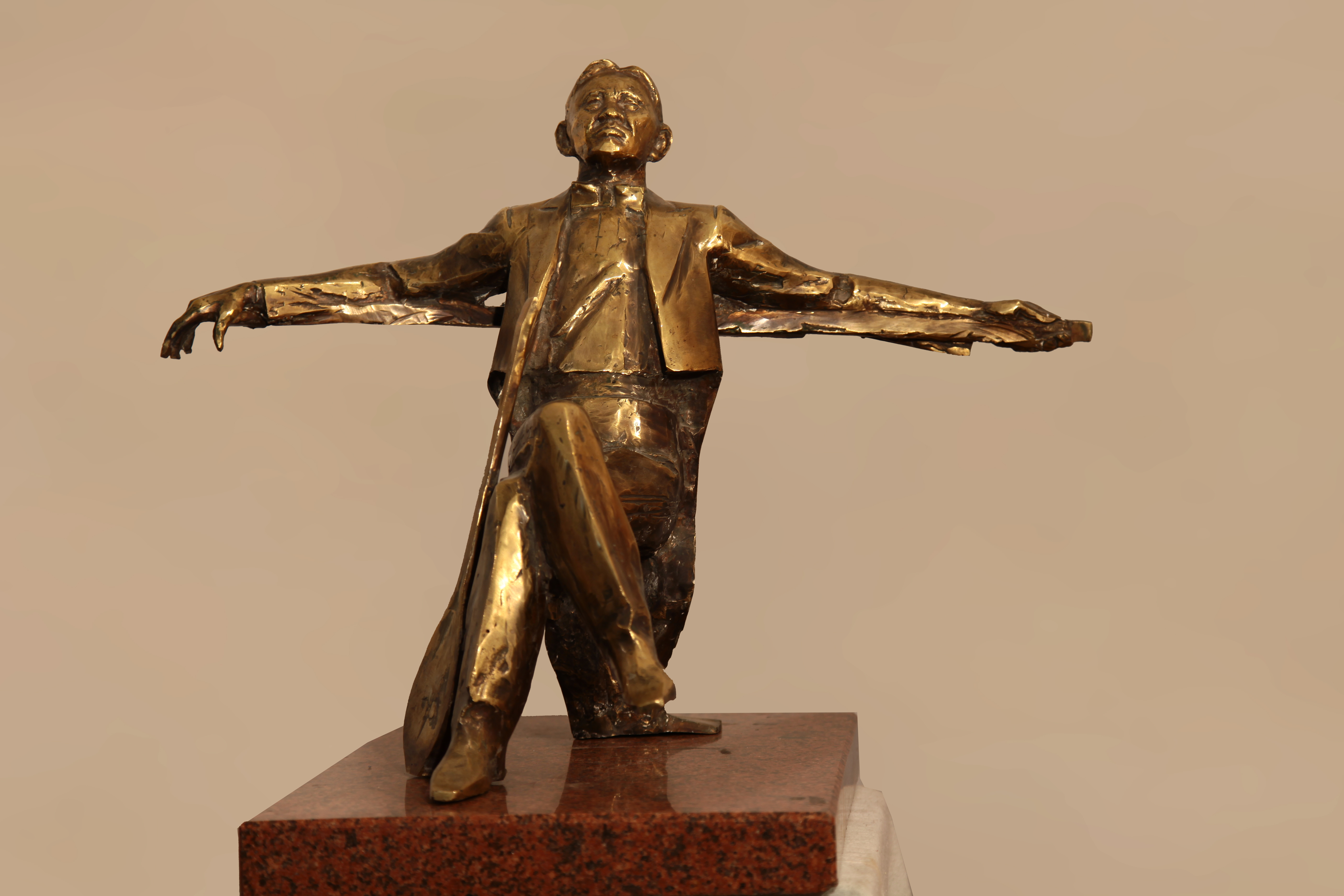
Nurgisa Tlendiyev. Easel sculpture. Material: bronze.

== Honours ==
- In 1982 Yesken Sergebayev got The State Prize for the monument of Mukhtar Auezov
- In 1983 Yesken Sergebayev got The Honored Art Worker State Prize
- The Honoured Arts Worker State Prize of the Republic of Kazakhstan (1993)
- In 2008 Yesken Sergebayev got The Order of Nobility (Order of Parasat) as a notable figure in the arts field of Kazakhstan.
