= Financial Women's Association =

- Type: Private
- Industry: Finance
- Founded: 1956
- Founder: Nancy Zuger
- Headquarters: New York City, United States of America
- Area served: United States of America
- Key people: Albana Theka, Annette Stewart, Hermina 'Nina' Batson, Alissa Desmarais
- Website: www.fwa.org

The Financial Women's Association (FWA) is a premier professional organization based in New York, uniting women and allies across the financial sector and beyond. Founded in 1956, the FWA champions the advancement of women at all career stages. The organization supports students and professionals through education, mentorship, scholarships, and thought leadership. With a mission to pave the way forward for equitable representation in finance, the FWA is a dynamic force for inclusion and opportunity in the industry.

== History ==
In 1956, eight women—Elizabeth Heaton, Audrey Hochberg, Nancy McNamara, Susan Rappaport, Jane Sheppard, Gloria Swope, Joan Williams, and Nancy Zuger—were denied admission to the Young Men’s Investment Association. In response, they founded the Young Women’s Investment Association, which was rebranded as the Financial Women’s Association in 1965. Their first event was a speaker luncheon in 1957. Today, the FWA continues to grow, engaging professionals from entry-level to C-suite. As of 2013, the FWA consisted of over 850 members.

== Activities ==
The FWA organizes nearly 100 events annually, ranging from intimate round-tables to major conferences. These events focus on leadership development, professional skills, market insights, DEI (diversity, equity, and inclusion), and fostering mentorship across generations of women in finance.

=== Women in Finance ===
The FWA advocates for the advancement of women in the financial industry through research, advocacy, and visibility. To this end, the organization has sponsored a number of fact-finding forums to encourage ongoing dialogue between the financial community and the public sector. The FWA also conducts surveys to highlight the inequalities that exist in the corporate world; one survey, for example, focusing on the disparity of women in corporate boards, was featured prominently in the media in late 2006. Another, showing the pay disparity between men and women in the financial sector, gained similar attention.

=== Mentorship ===
Mentorship is a cornerstone of the FWA's impact; the FWA aims to actively train and develop future female leaders in the financial field.. The organization runs comprehensive mentoring programs for high school, undergraduate, and graduate students, as well as for early- and mid-career professionals. These programs pair mentees with accomplished professionals and provide access to career guidance, networking, and growth opportunities.

=== Speakers ===
Through a series of high-profile events and functions, the FWA provides a forum for prominent women leaders; past noteworthy speakers at FWA events have included:

- Alan Krueger, Chair, White House Council of Economic Advisors
- Michael B. Donley, Secretary of the Air Force, Washington D.C.
- Kim Guadagno, Lieutenant Governor of New Jersey
- Richard Ketchum, Chairman and CEO FINRA
- Leo Melamed, Chairman Emeritus CME Group
- Carolyn Maloney, U.S. Congresswoman (D-12-NY)
- Christine Quinn, Speaker of the New York City Council
- Madeleine Albright, former Secretary of State
- Christine Whitman, former New Jersey governor
- Sheila Bair, the 19th Chairperson of the Federal Deposit Insurance Corporation
- Judith Rodin, the president of Rockefeller Foundation

=== Signature Events ===
The FWA Annual Dinner and Women of the Year Awards, the FWA's premiere event, is its primary fundraiser for the FWA of New York Educational Fund. The Annual Dinner takes place each year in the spring and attracts a high-level dais of dignitaries and a diverse audience of 700 executives and professionals from global corporations, professional firms, and leading nonprofits.

== FWA of New York Educational Fund ==
The FWA of New York Educational (Ed) Fund has been the educational arm of the FWA of New York Inc. Through the Ed Fund, FWA members engage in scholarship, mentoring, and learning activities in accordance with the FWA's philosophy of investing in the next generation and the wider business community. Founded as an unincorporated association in 1976, the FWA of New York Educational Fund was granted tax-exempt status as a 501(c)(3) charitable organization and incorporated in 1982.

=== Programs ===
==== High School Mentoring Program ====
The FWA's mentoring activities began at Murry Bergtraum in 1985-86. The FWA matches FWA mentors to students each year, until graduation. The program currently mentors 30 students each year. They participate in SAT and PSAT classes, financial aid workshops, book clubs, career discussion groups and overnight college visits. Students also volunteer at soup kitchens. In 2013, 100% of the mentees graduated high school and enrolled in college. As of 2014, the program is supported by two of underwriters: the Mah Jongg Foundation and U.S. Bankcorp.

==== Baruch College Mentoring ====
The FWA's mentoring activities launched at Baruch College in 2002. It evolved into a one-on-one mentoring program where mentors and mentees are paired and encouraged to meet and keep in contact. Currently, the program matches mentors with 30 undergraduate business students. The program offers various events throughout the school years including panel discussions, breakfast with FWA corporate sponsors, professional/business etiquette, holiday and fun events, and cocktail parties, etc. The program helps students explore career paths, gain networking experience and discover internship opportunities. The one-on-one mentoring model achieved recognition as a model program from Harvard University, and it continued to be expanded to online mentoring through the development of a web-based career development community.

==== Scholarships for High School Mentoring Graduates ====
Since 1988, the FWA of New York Educational Fund has awarded over $600,000 to over 175 qualifying graduating Murry Bergtraum High School mentees. BMO Capital Markets has provided funds for these scholarships since 2009.

==== FWA/BMO Capital Markets Scholars Fund at Baruch ====
The FWA endowed full scholarships for students in the FWA-Baruch College mentoring program. Funded by BMO Capital Markets, 23 young women have received support through this funding since 2005. Through its Equity Through Education "Day of Trading" Program, BMO Capital Markets has contributed over $1.6 million to the FWA of New York Educational Fund over the past eight years. Over 40 Baruch College students and 19 Murry Bergtraum High School students have received FWA/BMO Capital Market Scholarships in 2012-13.

==== MBA Scholarships ====
The program started in 1983. FWA Graduate Scholarships totaling $750,000 have assisted nearly 150 students in completing business degrees at the graduate level. The scholarships support graduate business education for women at four NYC-metro schools: MBA candidates at Baruch, Columbia, Fordham, and Stern (NYU); and an MIA candidate specializing in Microfinance at Columbia's School of International and Public Affairs (SIPA).

==== Wall Street Exchange ====
The Wall Street Exchange program typically provides an eight-week summer internship opportunity to enhance soft skills and job search techniques. It helps the participants to better prepare themselves for the workforce through designated events and programs. Since the 1970s, FWA corporate partners have hosted the workshops and have even hired some of the 1,000-plus WSE participants.

==== Financial Backpack ====
Since 2001, FWA members began offering financial literacy workshops to high school students through the FWA Financial Backpack program. Twice a year, in the fall and spring, a two-session workshop is held on the weekends, in conjunction with the NYC Department of Education's Job Readiness Program for Virtual Enterprise students. Smaller events are also held throughout the year with other education groups. Years ago, HSBC in the Community (USA) granted $900,000 to the FWA to expand the program over five years and offer it to more than 400 students annually. As of April 2013, nearly 3,000 students have come through the program.

==== Adult Financial Literacy ====
FWA members began teaching financial literacy to adult clients at University Settlement in lower Manhattan. Now the FWA Financial Literacy program is offering seven-week classes at Nontraditional Employment for Women (NEW) and the Grace Institute. Over 230 people have completed the program since its inception in 2003.

==== Educational Programs for the General Business Community ====
Educational programs conducted by the multiple committees are available to all members and guests of the FWA. These include: Professional Development, Not-for-Profit, Entrepreneurs, and Impact Investing.

=== New FWA/BMO Scholars Program ===
The FWA/BMO scholars are offered new programs to broader their experience. Two young women from Baruch studied in China, including 2013 annual dinner featured student speaker Fang Fang Nan. Ten students from Baruch were sent to Conferences at Simmons College in Boston and The National Conference for College Women Student Leaders at University of Maryland at College Park. Four to six students at Baruch College were offered Tools for Clear Speech Program, which involves a variety of resources designated to provide clear speech and intelligibility instructions for non-native English speakers. In addition, the FWA Scholar's Community Online was established to engage all past and current students and mentors allowing them to stay connected.
