= Fédération wallonne de l'agriculture =

Agriculture association in Wallonia, Belgium

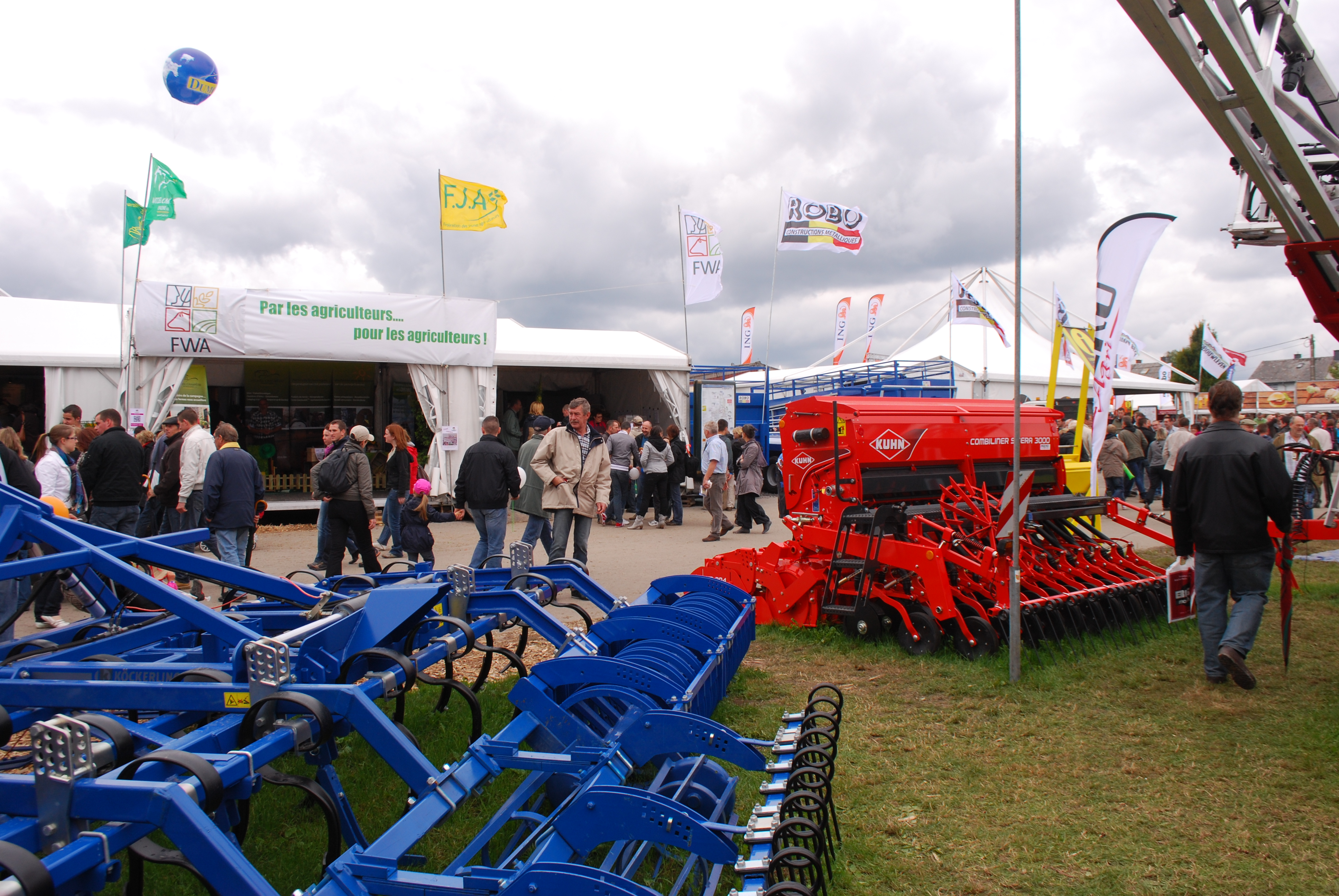
FWA booth with machines in front at the Libramont agricultural fair in 2011

The Fédération wallonne de l'agriculture (Wallonian Agricultural Federation), abbreviated FWA, is the main professional association for the agricultural sector in Wallonia, one of the regions of Belgium. It was founded in 2001 by a merger of a number of different farmers' associations.

In September 2019, José Renard became director of the FWA.
