= New Hampshire Liberty Alliance =

State libertarian coalition

- New Hampshire Liberty Alliance logo
- Established: November 2003
- Mission: A non-partisan coalition working to reduce the role of government in New Hampshire
- Chair: Shawn Faber
- Location: New Hampshire, United States
- Website: New Hampshire Liberty Alliance

The New Hampshire Liberty Alliance (NHLA) is a non-partisan, libertarian coalition in New Hampshire. The organization supports libertarian candidates for state and local offices and other libertarian causes and organizations. It also supports Republicans and Democrats who support limited government and "the protection of personal liberties."

== History ==
The New Hampshire Liberty Alliance was founded on November 1, 2003. The group participates in the Free State Project's annual New Hampshire Liberty Forum.

== The Gold Standard ==
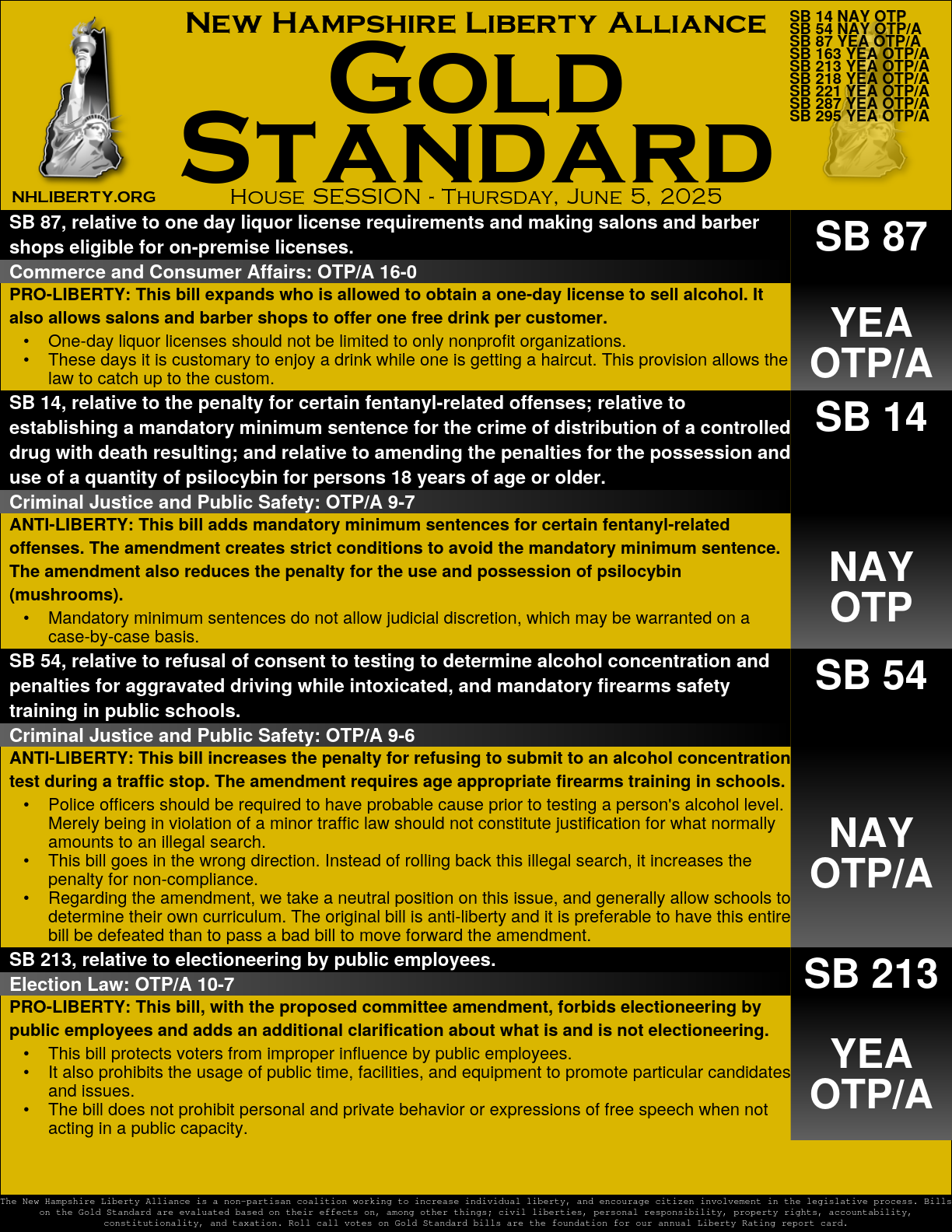
The Gold Standard from June 5, 2025

The main body of work of the New Hampshire Liberty Alliance is The Gold Standard, a vote recommendation newsletter distributed to state house and senate members ahead of votes on legislation. NHLA gives almost all legislation up for a vote a rating of either Pro-Liberty or Anti-Liberty and recommends a yes or no vote. The votes of all state house representatives and all state senators are recorded and used to develop the Liberty Rating scorecard.

== Liberty Rating ==
The Liberty Rating is a report card based upon votes made by legislators and the impact of those votes on personal liberties in New Hampshire. The report includes ratings as a percentage and as a letter grade. It is typically unveiled at the Liberty Dinner.

Just before the November elections in 2006, a New Hampshire Union Leader editorial stated, "if New Hampshire is to remain the live free or die state, we have to continue voting for freedom and against government coercion," and that "we are not with the Alliance on every single issue, but their scorecard is a good proxy for determining who is a friend or foe of personal freedoms."

== Liberty Dinner ==
The Liberty Dinner is the annual fundraiser of the New Hampshire Liberty Alliance. It is also known by the nickname "Liberty Prom".

At the Liberty Dinner, the New Hampshire Liberty Alliance gives the "Liberty Legislator of the Year" award to a member of the New Hampshire State Legislature and an "Activist of the Year" award. The 2025 Liberty Legislator of the Year was State Representative Kristin Noble.

Speakers at the Liberty Dinner have included Healing Our World author and 2008 Libertarian Party presidential candidate Mary Ruwart, New Hampshire Union Leader publisher Joe McQuaid, New Hampshire Secretary of State Bill Gardner, and former American Federation for Children senior fellow Corey DeAngelis.

== See also ==
- Politics of New Hampshire
