= Security Consultancy Wing =

Consultancy wing of the CISF

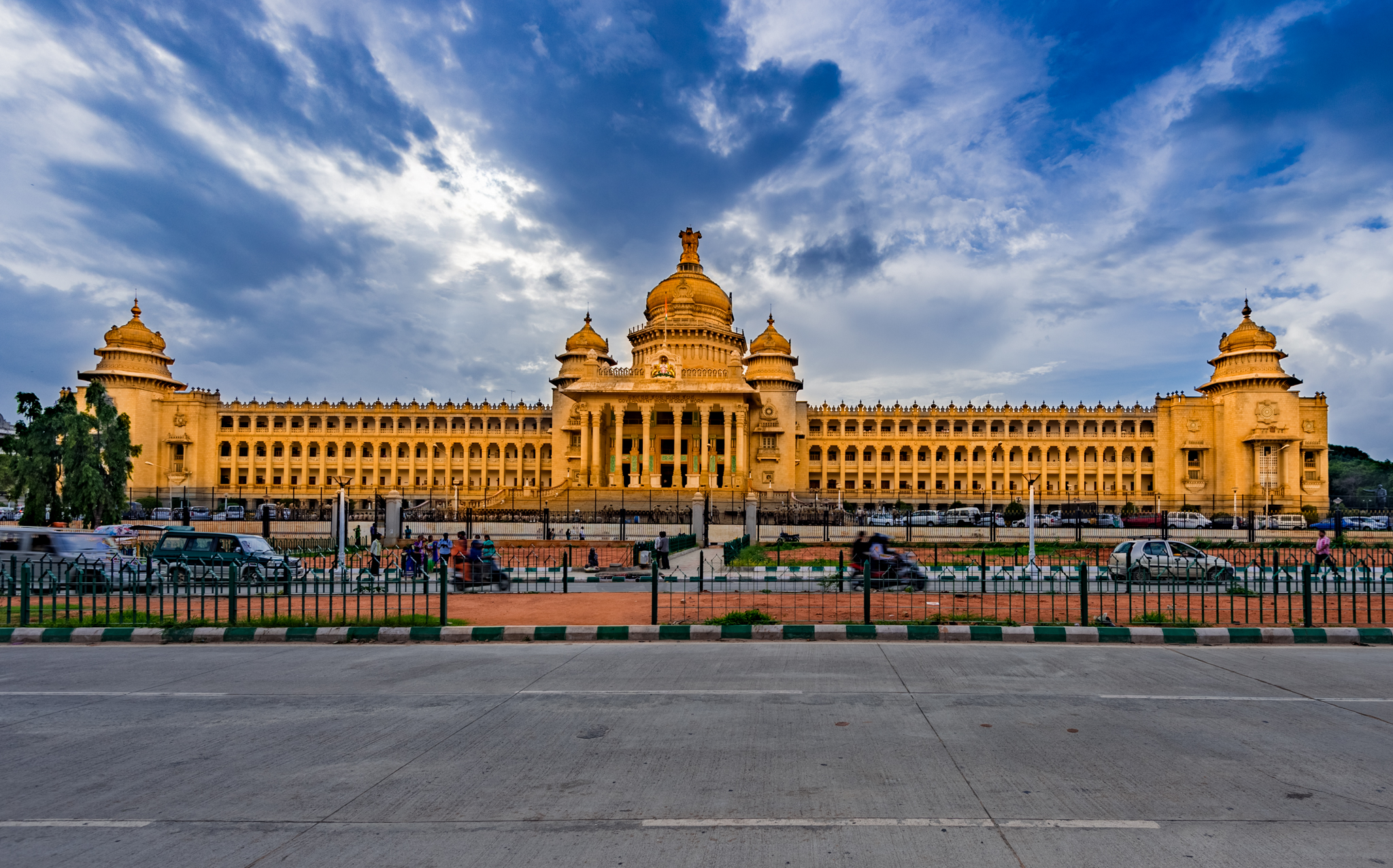
Karnataka Legislative Assembly was audited by the CISF in 2003.

The Security Consultancy Wing is a consultancy wing of the Central Industrial Security Force in India, responsible for providing consultancy services to both public and private enterprises in the fields of security and fire safety. The CISF received the mandate to provide such consultancy services to enterprises after an amendment in the Central Industrial Security Force Act, 1968, in 1999 and a wing dedicated for this purpose was launched on 7 December 2001 by the Deputy Prime Minister of India, Lal Krishna Advani. Located at the CISF Headquarters in New Delhi and headed by a deputy inspector general of police-rank officer, the wing has provided its services to many public and private bodies including industrial installations, educational institutions and government buildings among others.

== History ==
The Central Industrial Security Force was raised on 10 March 1969 by the Government of India to provide security and protection to the public sector undertakings of the country which were heavily focused on by the government. The role of CISF has evolved with time and it became from a "custodial force" of watch and ward character to law and order maintenance armed force after the 1983 amendment in the Central Industrial Security Force Act, 1968. Its role was further enhanced in 1999 when the Atal Bihari Vajpayee Government brought an amendment to the CISF Act to add, besides other provisions, a new section 14A with title "technical consultancy service to industrial establishments". This amendment provided the CISF a mandate to offer security consultancy services to the industrial establishments in the private sector on their requests after charging a fee which is to be credited in the consolidated fund of India as dictated by the subsection second of the mentioned section.

The Security Consultancy Wing was formally inaugurated by the Deputy Prime Minister Lal Krishna Advani on 7 December 2001 at the CISF Headquarters in New Delhi. The wing provides its consultancy services in the fields of security and fire protection to the establishments in both public and private sectors. It received an ISO 9001-2015 quality management certification from the International Organization for Standardization in 2018 for its quality services.

== Services ==
The Central Industrial Security Force is the only Government of India approved security consultancy body in India. It provides consultancy in threat perception, risk assessment, access control, perimeter protection, fire safety, executive protection, crowd control and crisis management among others. Its consultancy wing has been approached by many public and private enterprises for its services in the areas of security and fire protection including the Government of Qatar for its petroleum and natural gas industries and some of the member countries of South Asian Association for Regional Cooperation. It conducted a security audit of the 2019 Prayagraj Ardh Kumbh Mela held in Allahabad, Uttar Pradesh.

=== Consultancy to IITs and AIIMS, New Delhi ===
The CISF was handed over the responsibility of reviewing the security arrangements of Indian Institutes of Technology and All India Institute of Medical Sciences, New Delhi, by the Government of India in 2015. These institutions are the institutes of national importance and the-then Director General of CISF Arvind Ranjan directly monitored the audit of each institute and a special plan was formulated for the purpose.

=== Consultancy to jails in Madhya Pradesh ===
The Government of Madhya Pradesh requested the CISF to carry out a security and fire safety review of the four central jails in the state, Bhopal, Indore, Gwalior and Jabalpur, after 8 suspected terrorists of Students Islamic Movement of India escaped from the Bhopal Central Jail on 31 October 2016. The consultancy wing constituted a team of 5 members that visited the Bhopal Central Jail and conducted the audit. It submitted a report to the Government of Madhya Pradesh in December 2016 which included recommendations highlighting the inadequacy of manpower guarding the jail and incorporation of modern security gadgets and technology to augment the current security arrangements in the jail.

=== Consultancy to private sector enterprises ===
The Consultancy Wing has been approached by many private sector enterprises since 2001 and experienced six-time increase in the total requests for its service in 2014. The Consultancy Wing started receiving at least 10 such requests every month by 2018 and witnessed an increase in them after any violent event like 2017 Dera Sacha Sauda-related riots and Jat reservation agitation of 2016 which might cause threat of vandalism to private businesses.

=== Consultancy to schools ===
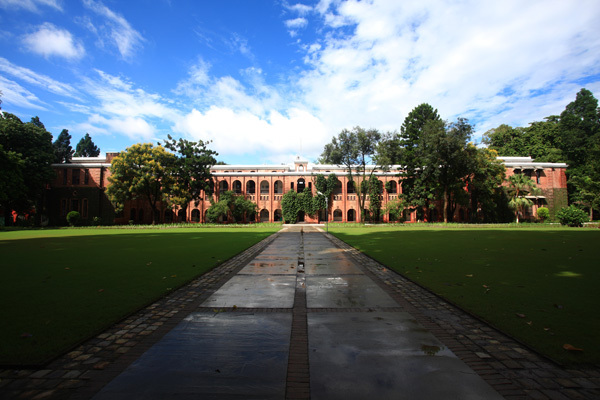
Doon School was one of the many schools in the country that requested the CISF to review its security arrangements in 2018.

After the murder of Pradyuman Thakur, who was found dead in a bathroom of his school, Ryan International School, at Gurugram, the CISF wrote to various public and private schools across the country in November 2017 to share its interest in providing consultancy for security in the school premises at a nominal fee. The Consultancy Wing already had an experience in reviewing the security arrangements of many premier institutions of higher education, including several Indian Institutes of Technology, Indian Institute of Management Indore and All India Institute of Medical Sciences, New Delhi, and providing its services to them. The wing received requests from 28 schools including Doon School, Dehradun, Bharatiya Vidya Bhavan's Mehta Vidyalaya, St. Xavier's Institution, Pathways School, Gurugram, by March 2018. A fee of ₹4,00,000 to 4,50,000 was charged to per school, much lower than what private security consultancy agencies charge for the same service. The schools were provided consultancy in access control, demarcation of CCTV cameras, lighting in the buildings and premises, methods of training and deployment of security guards and installation of security and emergency response gadgets.

== Fee structure ==
The fees CISF charge to its clients are reviewed by the Ministry of Home Affairs periodically and approved for a period of two years at a time. It is credited to the consolidated fund of India. The Government of India increased the fees for private enterprises fourfold in 2013. The fee is required to be paid in advance and the current rates as of 7 March 2019 are:

Category	Security consultancy alone (in Rs.)	Fire consultancy alone (in Rs.)	Both security and fire consultancy (in Rs.)
Large	14,50,000	8,25,000	18,75,000
Medium	8,25,000	4,25,000	11,75,000
Small	4,25,000	2,75,000	6,50,000

== Procedure ==
The Consultancy Wing is headed by a deputy inspector general of police-rank officer, DIG/Technical. A formal request is sent in writing to the CISF Headquarters in New Delhi addressed to the head of the wing by the interested enterprise. The information regarding the enterprise and the requirements of the client are requested by the wing. A preliminary visit is carried out at the site for which consultancy is requested and after the advance payment of the fee a team is detailed for the purpose. The team visits the site for the security audit and prepares a draft report of recommendations after including the views of the client. The draft report is submitted to the wing for assessment and examination. After the approval of the Director General of CISF, the final report is sent to the client.
