= List of international presidential trips made by Pervez Musharraf =

This is a list of international presidential trips made by Pervez Musharraf, the 10th President of Pakistan.

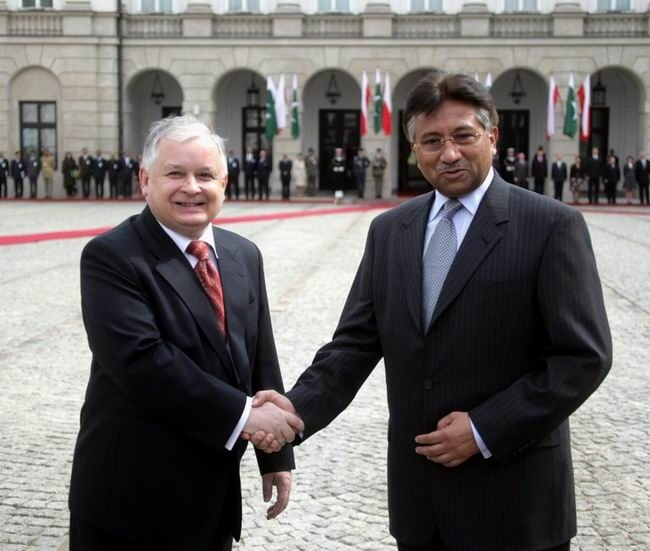
President of Pakistan General Pervez Musharraf meeting with President of Poland Lech Kaczyński in Warsaw, 23 April 2007.

== 1999 ==
Country	Date/s	Engagements	Ref.
Saudi Arabia	25-27 October	Met with King Fahd.	
UAE	25-27 October	Met with President Zayed bin Sultan.	
Qatar	7-9 November	Met with Emir of Qatar	
Turkey	7-9 November	Met with President Süleyman Demirel. Visited Mustafa Kemal Atatürk shrine.	
Kuwait	7-9 November	Met with Emir of Kuwait.	
Bahrain	8-9 December	Met with Emir Hamad bin Isa.	
Iran	8-9 December	Met with Khamenei and President Khatami.	

== 2000 ==
Country	Date/s	Engagements	Ref.
China	17-18 January	Met with President Jiang Zemin and Premier Zhu Rongji.	
Malaysia	27 March - 4 April	Met with Prime Minister Mahathir Mohamad.	
Singapore	27 March - 4 April	Met with Prime Minister Goh Chok Tong.	
Indonesia	27 March - 4 April	Met with President Abdurrahman Wahid.	
Brunei	27 March - 4 April	Met with Sultan of Brunei Hassanal Bolkiah.	
Thailand	27 March - 4 April	Met with Prime Minister Chuan Leekpai.	
France	9-19 April	Musharraf met French foreign minister Hubert Védrine.	
Cuba	9-19 April	Attended "The South Summit of G77 ". Met with President Fidel Castro.	
Egypt	9-19 April	Met with President Hosni Mubarak and PM Atef Ebeid.	
Libya	9-19 April	Met with Leader of Libya Muammar Gaddafi.	
Turkmenistan	15-16 May	Met with President Saparmurat Niyazov.	
Iran	10-12 June	Attended "6th ECO Summit".	
Oman	10-12 June	Met with Sultan Qaboos bin Said.	
Turkmenistan	6-7 November	Met with President Saparmurat Niyazov.	
Kazakhstan	6-7 November	Met with President Nursultan Nazarbayev.	
Qatar	12-14 November	Attended "9th OIC Summit".	

== 2001 ==
Country	Date/s	Engagements	Ref.
Syria	7-10 January	Met with President Bashar al-Assad and Prime Minister Muhammad Mero.	
Jordan	7-10 January	Met with King Abdullah II.	
Lebanon	7-10 January	Met with President Émile Lahoud.	
Egypt	24-25 February	Attended "D-8 Summit".	
Myanmar	1-5 May	Signed bilateral agreement on Science and Technology	
Vietnam	1-5 May	Met with Prime Minister Phan Văn Khải.	
India	14-16 July	Attended Agra Summit but it was ended without any conclusion.	
Iran	7-14 November	Stopover. Met with First Vice President Reza Aref.	
France	7-14 November	Met with President Jacques Chirac.	
UK	7-14 November	Met with PM Tony Blair.	
United Nations	7-14 November	Attended UNGA session. Met with US president George W. Bush.	
Turkey	7-14 November	Met with PM Bülent Ecevit.	
China	20-24 December	Met with President and Vice President of China.	

== 2002 ==
Country	Date/s	Engagements	Ref.
China	3-6 January	Met with Premier of China.	
Nepal	3-6 January	Attended "11th SAARC Summit".	
United States	12-14 February	Met with President Bush and Defense secretary Rumsfeld.	
Japan	13-16 March	Met with Emperor Akihito and PM Junichiro Koizumi.	
Afghanistan	2 April	Met Afghan Interim Administration chairman, Hamid Karzai.	
Tajikistan	2-4 June	Met with President Emomali Rahmon.	
Kazakhstan	2-4 June	Attended "1st CICA Summit". Also met Presidents of China and Russia.	
UAE	10-12 June	Met with President Zayed bin Sultan.	
Saudi Arabia	10-12 June	Met with Crown Prince Abdullah bin Abdulaziz.	
Bangladesh	29 July - 2 August	Met with PM Khaleda Zia.	
Sri Lanka	29 July - 2 August	Met with PM Ranil Wickremesinghe.	
China	29 July - 2 August	Met with President Jiang Zemin.	
United Nations	12 September	Attended UNGA session.	
Turkey	14 October	Attended "7th ECO Summit".	
Saudi Arabia	28-29 October	Met with King Fahd.	

== 2003 ==
Country	Date/s	Engagements	Ref.
Russia	4-6 February	Met with Russian president Vladimir Putin.	
Malaysia	23-25 February	Attended "13th NAM Summit".	
Saudi Arabia	11 June	Met with Crown Prince Abdullah.	
UK	17 June - 4 July	Met with PM Tony Blair.	
United States	17 June - 4 July	Met with President Bush in Washington and Camp David. Visited Boston and Los Angeles.	
Germany	17 June - 4 July	Met with German president Johannes Rau.	
France	17 June - 4 July	Met with President Jacques Chirac.	
Tunisia	14-19 July	Met with President Zine El Abidine.	
Algeria	14-19 July	Met with President Abdelaziz Bouteflika.	
Morocco	14-19 July	Met with King Mohammed VI.	
Malaysia	14-18 October	Attended "10th OIC Summit". Met with President Putin.	
United Nations	24-26 September	Attended "UNGA Session". Met with POTUS and UNSG.	
Canada	24-26 September	Met with PM Jean Chrétien.	
China	1-7 November	Met with President Hu Jintao. Attended "Boao Forum for Asia".	
South Korea	1-7 November	Met with President Roh Moo-hyun.	

== 2004 ==
Country	Date/s	Engagements	Ref.
Turkey	20-24 January	Met with President Ahmet Necdet Sezer.	
Switzerland	20-24 January	Attended "World Economic Forum Conference".	
Saudi Arabia	6-7 March	Met with King Fahd and Crown Prince Abdullah. Also performed Umrah.	
Sweden	4-8 July	Met with PM Göran Persson.	
Finland	4-8 July	Met with President Tarja Halonen.	
Azerbaijan	8-10 July	Met with President Ilham Aliyev.	
United Nations	21-30 September	Attended "UNGA Session". Met with POTUS and UNSG.	
Netherlands	21-30 September	Met with Deputy Prime Minister Gerrit Zalm.	
Italy	21-30 September	Met with Prime Minister Silvio Berlusconi and Pope John Paul II.	
Afghanistan	6 November	Met with President Hamid Karzai.	
Turkey	26 November - 9 December	Stopover. Met with President Ahmet Necdet Sezer.	
Morocco	26 November - 9 December	Stopover. Met with PM Driss Jettou.	
Senegal	26 November - 9 December	Stopover. Met with President Abdoulaye Wade .	
Brazil	26 November - 9 December	Met with President Luiz Inácio Lula in Brasília. Visited Rio de Janeiro and São Paulo.	
Argentina	26 November - 9 December	Met with President Néstor Kirchner.	
Mexico	26 November - 9 December	Met with President Vicente Fox.	
United States	26 November - 9 December	Met with President Bush.	
UK	26 November - 9 December	Met with PM Tony Blair.	
France	26 November - 9 December	Met with President Jacques Chirac.	

== 2005 ==
Country	Date/s	Engagements	Ref.
Lebanon	5-8 March	Unofficial visit. Visited grave of Ex-Lebanonise PM Rafic Hariri. Met with his family to condole his death.	
Uzbekistan	5-8 March	Met with President Islam Karimov.	
Kyrgyzstan	5-8 March	Met with President Askar Akayev.	
India	16-24 April	Met with PM Manmohan Singh. Visited Mu'in al-Din Chishti shrine. Watched 6th ODI of Pakistani team in India in 2004–05.	
Philippines	16-24 April	Met with President Gloria Macapagal Arroyo.	
Indonesia	16-24 April	Attended "50th anniversary of Afro-Asian Conference". Met with President Susilo Bambang.	
UAE	4-6 June	Met with President Khalifa bin Zayed.	
Qatar	4-6 June	Met with Emir of Qatar Hamad bin Khalifa.	
Australia	13-19 June	Met with Prime Minister John Howard in Canberra. Also visited Sydney.	
New Zealand	13-19 June	Met with Prime Minister Helen Clark.	
Thailand	13-19 June	Met with Prime Minister Thaksin Shinawatra.	
Saudi Arabia	25-26 June	Met with Crown Prince Abdullah. Performed Umrah and visited Prophet's Mosque.	
United Nations	14-17 September	Addressed "2005 World Summit". Met with PM Manmohan Singh, also met Prime Minister of Israel Ariel Sharon (informally). Held dinner meeting with members of American Jewish Congress.	
Kuwait	3-8 December	Met with Emir Jaber Al-Ahmad.	
Yemen	3-8 December	Met with President Ali Abdullah Saleh.	
Saudi Arabia	3-8 December	Attended "3rd Extraordinary OIC Summit".	

== 2006 ==
Country	Date/s	Engagements	Ref.
UAE	22-29 January	Met with Vice President of UAE to condole over death of Ex-PM Maktoum bin Rashid.	
Norway	22-29 January	Met with Harald V and PM Jens Stoltenberg.	
Switzerland	22-29 January	Attended "World Economic Forum Conference".	
China	19-23 February	Met with President Hu Jintao, signed multiple agreements, visited Sichuan.	
UAE	18 April	Met with Crown Prince of Abu Dhabi. Watched 1st ODI of 2005–06 DLF Cup.	
China	15-17 June	Attended "6th SCO Head of State Summit". Met with President Hu and Putin.	
Kazakhstan	15-17 June	Attended "2nd CICA Summit".	
Afghanistan	6-7 September	Met with President Hamid Karzai, held talks about Al-Qaeda and Taliban.	
Belgium	11-29 September	Met with PM of Belgium, Pres. of the European Commission, Pres. of the European Parliament and others.	
Cuba	11-29 September	Attended "14th NAM Summit". Met with Indian PM Manmohan Singh.	
United States	11-29 September	Attended "UNGA Session". Met with President Bush and Karzai.	
UK	11-29 September	Met with British PM Tony Blair.	

== 2007 ==
Country	Date/s	Engagements	Ref.
Saudi Arabia	20-24 January	Met with King Abdullah.	
Egypt	20-24 January	Met with President Hosni Mubarak.	
Jordan	20-24 January	Met with Abdullah II.	
Syria	20-24 January	Met with President Bashar al-Assad.	
UAE	20-24 January	Met with President Khalifa bin Zayed.	
Indonesia	30-31 January	Met with President Susilo Bambang.	
Malaysia	30-31 January	Met with PM Abdullah Ahmad.	
Iran	5-6 February	Met with Supreme Leader and President of Iran.	
Turkey	5-6 February	Met with President Ahmet Necdet Sezer.	
Poland	22-30 April	Met with President Lech Kaczyński and PM Jarosław Kaczyński.	
Spain	22-30 April	Met with PM José Luis.	
Bosnia and Herzegovina	22-30 April	Met with Chairman of Presidency Nebojša Radmanović.	
Turkey	22-30 April	Attended "Afghan-Pak-Turk Trilateral Summit".	
UAE	27-28 July	Met with Crown Prince of Abu Dhabi Mohamed bin Zayed. Held secret meeting with People's Party Chairperson Benazir Bhutto.	
Saudi Arabia	27-28 July	Met with King Abdullah and performed Umrah.	
Saudi Arabia	20 November	Met with King Abdullah.	

== 2008 ==
Country	Dates	Engagements	Ref.
Belgium	20-28 January	Met with PM of Belgium Guy Verhofstadt, also met Javier Solana. Addressed Pakistani community.	
France	20-28 January	Met with French president Nicolas Sarkozy.	
Switzerland	20-28 January	Attended "World Economic Forum Conference".	
UK	20-28 January	Met with British prime minister Gordon Brown.	
China	10-15 April	Attended "Boao Forum for Asia". Met with President Jintao and Premier Jiabao, also visited Ürümqi.	
