= Rajwinder Singh Bhatti =

Director General of the Central Industrial Security Force

Director General of Central Industrial Security Force
- In office 1 September 2024 – 30 September 2025
- Preceded by: Nina Singh
- Succeeded by: Praveer Ranjan

Personal details
- Born: 27 September 1965 (age 61) Jamarai Village, Tarn Taran, Punjab, India
- Occupation: IPS officer
- Profession: Civil servant
- Awards: President's Police Medal for Distinguished Service and Meritorious Service (2006 & 2014)

Rajwinder Singh Bhatti (born 27 September 1965) is a 1990 batch retired Indian Police Service (IPS) officer from Bihar cadre and has served as the Director General of the Central Industrial Security Force of India from 1 September 2024 till 30 September 2025.

== Personal life ==
Bhatti was born on 27 September 1965 in Jamarai Village, Tarn Taran district of Punjab, India. He belongs to Sikhs family and his son-in-law Maninder Singh is a Punjab-cadre IPS officer who is currently posted as ACP in Amritsar.

== Career ==
Bhatti previously held the position of Director General of Bihar Police from December 2022 till August 2024 and served as the Joint Director of MDMA in the CBI. On 29 August 2024, the Government of India appointed Bhatti as the Director General of Central Industrial Security Force where he served till 30 September 2025. Bhatti is a Chartered Accountant, holds an M.Phil degree, and has held numerous important and sensitive positions both in Bihar and in the central government.

== Accolades ==
He was received President's Police Medal for Distinguished Service and Meritorious Service in 2006 and in 2014.
