= Ryan International =

Ryan International may refer to:

- Ryan International Group of Institutions or Ryan International Schools, a group of private educational institutions founded in India in 1976, with 128 schools located in 18 states within India and 2 in the United Arab Emirates
- Ryan International Airlines, an American airline founded in 1972 and ceased operations in 2013
