= Central Industrial Security Force Act, 1968 =

Act of the Indian Parliament

The Central Industrial Security Force Act, 1968, is an act of the Indian Parliament through which the Central Industrial Security Force (CISF) was raised on 10 March 1969. The CISF is a Central Armed Police Force which specialises in providing security and protection to industrial undertakings and other critical installations including nuclear plants, space centres and Delhi Metro. It is also the airport police of India.

The Government of India brought the bill in parliament in 1967 after the recommendation of a special commission, Mukherjee Commission, that was appointed to investigate a major fire at Heavy Engineering Corporation production plant in Ranchi and thereafter recommended constituting a federal force exclusively for the security of industries. After the approval of the President, the bill became an act on 2 December 1968 and came into force on 10 March 1969 when the CISF was raised with a strength of 2,800 personnel. It was first inducted at Fertilizer Corporation of India manufacturing plant in Trombay, Maharashtra, on 1 November 1969.

Originally the CISF was a force of watch and ward nature for maintaining vigilance and guard at the public sector industries, but it was made an armed force of the union after an amendment in 1983. The kidnapping and killing of H. L. Khera, general manager of CISF-protected Hindustan Machine Tools watch factory at Srinagar, by the members of Students Liberation Front in April 1989 led to the government to bring an amendment to the act to make it a duty of CISF personnel to protect and safeguard the employees of an enterprise where it is deployed. The CISF received a mandate to provide paid security consultancy services to both public and private sector enterprises through an amendment to the act in 1949. The last amendment to the act was brought in 2009 which made it possible for the CISF to provide its security services to private sector enterprises as well. The same amendment enhanced the territorial purview of the force by enabling the Central Government to deploy it outside of India.

== Background ==
India adopted the Soviet model of planned economy after the independence and Prime Minister Jawaharlal Nehru promoted an economic policy based on import substitution industrialisation. The second five-year plan (1956–60) and the Industrial Policy Resolution of 1956 emphasised the development of public sector undertakings (PSUs) to meet Nehru's national industrialisation policy. The Government of India emphasised heavily in developing industries and its concern for the industrial security persuaded it in 1961 to appoint a high-ranking police officer as the Security Advisor in the Department of Industry for advising the PSUs on security related matters. Findings of the Security Advisor outlined many defects in the security arrangements of the PSUs and recommendation was made to set up a "unified force" exclusively to provide security and protection to PSUs.

A major fire at Heavy Engineering Corporation (HEC) production plant in Ranchi on 29 January 1964 resulted in a large loss of property. This incident was followed by disturbances among the workers of the plant in the town. The local policemen that were responsible for guarding the industrial plant were diverted and deployed to apprehend the growing violence and maintain law and order in the town, which left the security of the plant compromised. These developments highlighted poor state of industrial security in the country and attracted national attention including of the Parliament. The Government of India acted upon the issue by appointing a judicial commission of inquiry headed by a retired justice of Allahabad High Court B. Mukherjee. The Mukherjee Commission found sabotage as a reason behind the fire at the HEC and reported inadequate security arrangements in industries at large. His report also recommended the creation of a central industrial security force under the Government of India. When the matter was discussed and the report was tabled at the Lok Sabha on 3 October 1964, the Union Minister of Industry and Steel Tribhuvan Narain Singh assured the house that the suggestion of Justice Mukherjee regarding setting up a central security agency for industrial security was under examination by the government.

== Raising of the CISF ==
The Government of India brought the Central Industrial Security Force Bill, 1968, in order to materialise the recommendations for establishing a federally-governed industrial security force. When the bill was discussed in the parliament, strong objections were raised by the members of opposition parties against the clause which conferred power of arrest to the personnel of CISF, which is usually held by state police. Members of the opposition parties expressed their disapproval as they were of the opinion that this clause would infringe upon the constitutional right of the states by allowing a federal force to exercise the power which otherwise comes under a state subject. However, the objection was dismissed by the Union Minister of State for Home Affairs, Vidya Charan Shukla, by underscoring the inadequacy of the contemporary security system of the PSUs and the urgency of forming a trained disciplined force to ameliorate the latter. The bill became an act on 2 December 1968 and came into force on 10 March 1969 when the Central Industrial Security Force was raised with a strength of 2,800 personnel. This day is celebrated every year by the force as its Raising Day. However, the force was not made an armed force and its mandate was of watch and ward nature for maintaining vigilance and guard at the industries. The first induction of the CISF in a PSU was held at a Fertilizer Corporation of India manufacturing plant (which was later reorganised into Rashtriya Chemicals & Fertilizers) in Trombay, Maharashtra on 1 November 1969 and the next day on 2 November 1969 it was inducted at Bokaro Steel Company Limited, Bokaro.

== Amendments ==
There have been Five amendments in the CISF Act which were brought in 1983, 1989, 1999 and 2009. Successive amendments enhanced the power and jurisdiction purview of the force. The amendment of 1983 made the CISF an armed force of the Union of India. The 1989 amendment made it a duty of the force to provide protection and safeguard to the employees of an enterprise where it is deployed. The provision to provide technical consultancy to industrial establishments including the private sector was added through the amendment of 1999. The mandate to provide its security service to the private sector enterprises was enabled by the amendment of 2009.

=== Amendment Act of 1983 ===
The Government of India brought an amendment bill, the Central Industrial Security Force (Amendment) Bill, 1983, to grant the status of armed force to the CISF. The amendment was passed in March 1983 and came into force three months later on 15 June. It effectively prohibits the CISF personnel from becoming a member of any association which is not of a "purely social, recreational or religious nature" without getting approval of the Central Government or of the competent authority. It also forbids the members of force from addressing or participating in any political gathering and communicating with the press. While adding to the restrictions already incorporated in the original act, the amendment augmented the disciplinary powers of the supervisory officers. The status of armed force brought the CISF under the purview of article 33 of the Indian Constitution which empowers the parliament to restrict or abrogate the fundamental rights of the members of armed forces. The amendment extended the powers of the force and it became from a "custodial force" to "law and order maintenance force".

=== Amendment Act of 1989 ===
An amendment to the Section 10 of the CISF Act, 1968, in 1989 made it a duty of CISF personnel to protect and safeguard the employees of an enterprise where it is deployed. The Government of India brought this amendment after the kidnapping and killing of H. L. Khera, general manager of Hindustan Machine Tools watch factory at Srinagar, by the members of Students Liberation Front. The CISF was deployed at this installation when its general manager Khera was kidnapped on 6 April 1989 and four days later on 10 April his dead body was recovered by police in Srinagar.

=== Amendment Act of 1999 ===
The CISF Act, 1968, was amended by the Atal Bihari Vajpayee Government to add two major provisions besides other minor changes; one was to enable the Central Government to entrust any other duty to the CISF by changing Section 3 titled "Constitution of the Force" and another was by adding a new Section 14A with title "Technical Consultancy Service to industrial establishments". This amendment provided the CISF a mandate to offer security consultancy services to the industrial establishments in the private sector on their requests after charging a fee which is to be credited to the consolidated fund of India as dictated by the second subsection of the mentioned section.

=== Amendment Act of 2009 ===
A series of terrorist attacks in Mumbai in November 2008—in which, besides other locations, the Taj Mahal Palace Hotel and the Oberoi Trident hotel were also targeted— prompted many private sector companies, including Tata Group, The Oberoi Group, Infosys and the Jamnagar Refinery of Reliance Industries Limited, to request the Minister of Home Affairs P. Chidambaram to allow CISF security cover for their respective enterprises. The 2008 bombing of Indian embassy in Kabul also persuaded the Central Government to improve the security arrangements of Indian diplomatic missions abroad. However, the mandate of the CISF as per the CISF Act, 1968, allowed it to provide its security service to public sector undertakings and to be deployed in Indian territory only. The Manmohan Singh Government brought an amendment in December 2009 to enlarge the mandate of the force related to its service and deployment. The Central Industrial Security Force (Amendment) Bill, 2008, was introduced by Chidambaram in the Rajya Sabha on 18 December 2008. It proposed to bring joint ventures of federal government or state governments with private industrial undertakings and private sector enterprises in the possible security ambit of the CISF and to enhance the territorial purview of the force by enabling the Central Government to deploy it outside of India. The bill was referred to the parliamentary Standing Committee on Home Affairs, headed by Sushma Swaraj, at the last day of the winter session of the parliament on 1 January 2009. The government decided to bring an ordinance to give effect to amendments proposed in the bill after the approval of the Union Cabinet on 2 January 2009. The ordinance, the Central Industrial Security Force (Amendment) Ordinance, 2009, was promulgated on 10 January 2009.

After scrutinising the bill, the standing committee tabled its report at parliament on 13 February 2009. Subsequently, the bill was passed by the Lok Sabha on 19 February 2009 and by the Rajya Sabha on 25 February 2009. The amendment act was published in the Gazette of India on 16 March 2009 after receiving the assent of the President. It came into force retrospectively from 10 January 2009 due to the promulgation of the ordinance. The Ministry of Home Affairs outlined a priority order for the CISF to take into consideration before assessing the requests of private sector undertakings. According to this order, the first priority is to be given to sectors like power, atomic energy, space, airports, science and technology and information technology; the second priority covers major private undertakings situated in Naxalite or insurgency-affected areas; and lastly those undertakings which do not get covered by either of two categories could be given security after threat analysis.

== Bibliography ==
- Chatterjee, D. K. (2005). Central Police Organisations, Part 1. New Delhi: Allied Publishers. ISBN 8177649027.
- Desai, Akshayakumar Ramanlal (1986). Violation of Democratic Rights in India. Mumbai: Popular Prakashan. ISBN 0861321308.
- "The Central Industrial Security Force Act, 1968" (PDF). Legislative.gov.in. Legislative Department, Ministry of Law and Justice, Government of India.
- "The Central Industrial Security Force Rules, 2001" (PDF). Cisf.gov.in. Central Industrial Security Force, Ministry of Home Affairs, Government of India.
- "Central Industrial Security Force" (PDF). Department Related Parliamentary Standing Committee on Home Affairs – Working Conditions in Non-Border Guarding Central Armed Police Forces (Report) (215 ed.). Rajya Sabha Secretariat. 12 December 2018.
