= Mecca Declaration =

Mecca Declaration (or Makkah al-Mukarramah Declaration) may refer to:

- The Mecca Declaration of 1981 of the Third Islamic Summit Conference
- The Mecca Declaration of 2005 of the Third Extraordinary Session of the Islamic Summit Conference
- The Mecca Declaration of 2006, demanding an end to sectarian feuds in Iraq
- The Mecca Declaration of 2007, announcing the formation of a unity government including Hamas and Fatah
