= Agra Summit =

Summit meeting between India and Pakistan

2001 India–Pakistan Agra Summit
- Type: Peace and bilateral efforts to bring stability in the region
- Context: Post-Cold war
- Drafted: 16 July 2001
- Signed: No signatures; the process was collapsed
- Mediators: Foreign ministries of India and Pakistan
- Negotiators: Pervez Musharraf _{(President of Pakistan)}; Atal Bihari Vajpayee _{(Prime Minister of India)}
- Parties: India; Pakistan
- Languages: Hindi; Urdu; English

The Agra Summit was a two-day summit meeting between India and Pakistan which lasted from 14 to 16 July 2001. It was organized with the aim of resolving long-standing issues between India and Pakistan.

At this meeting, a proposal was made to drastically reduce nuclear arsenals, and other issues involving the Kashmir dispute, and cross-border terrorism were also discussed. Negotiations broke down and the Agra treaty was not signed.

== Overview ==
Earlier in 1999, during Indian PM Atal Bihari Vajpayee's visit to Pakistan, both countries had acceded and successfully ratified the Lahore Declaration and pledged to make joint efforts for peace and stability in South Asia. The Kargil war was a major blow to the Lahore treaty and it stalled the treaty as the relations between two countries suffered a serious setback. General Musharraf is widely believed to be a strategic mastermind and brain behind the Kargil war.

On 11 March 2001, the UN Secretary-General Kofi Annan called upon both India and Pakistan to retain the spirit of the Lahore Declaration, saying that it would require restraint, wisdom, and constructive steps from both sides. Finally, the framework for negotiations of the Agra treaty began with talks in New Delhi between President Pervez Musharraf and Prime Minister Atal Bihari Vajpayee in July 2001.

After much diplomatic efforts, the Agra summit started amid high hopes of resolving various disputes between the two countries including the five decades old Kashmir issue. Both sides started the summit with hopefulness and in a spirit of good will; especially President Musharraf who used the phrases "cautious optimism", "flexibility" and "open mind" to describe his views for the summit. The Indian President, K. R. Narayanan, also promised to take "bold and innovative" measures and to discuss the "core issue" between the two countries.

Various rounds of one-to-one talks were held between President Musharraf and Prime Minister Vajpayee. On the first day, a 90-minute one-on-one session was held and the two leaders discussed the Kashmir issue, cross-border terrorism, nuclear risk reduction, release of prisoners of war, and commercial ties. There were high hopes in Pakistan that both the leaders would arrive at an agreement and a joint statement or declaration would be made at the end of the summit as the two leaders plunged into serious talks. Despite reservations from the Indian Government, President Musharraf also held face-to-face meetings with the top Kashmiri leadership represented by the All Parties Hurriyat Conference.

The most important agenda of Prime Minister, Atal Bihari Vajpayee, in the India–Pakistan summit was to stress upon the economic betterment of the people of Kashmir, for which he invited a dialogue with the All Parties Hurriyat Conference.

Quote:

"Pakistan has been seeking a solution to J&K in accordance with the wishes of the "Kashmiri people". I am certain that the primary wish of every single Kashmiri, whether from the Kashmir valley or Jammu, Ladakh, Pakistan occupied Kashmir, the Northern areas or the Shaksgam Valley, is to live in peace, security and freedom, so that he can make economic progress. We should constantly strive to provide him with this fundamental right. Most of the Kashmiris have their elected representatives, through whom they express their legitimate aspirations. We are also willing to listen to all other streams of Kashmiri opinion, however small the minority they represent, as long as they abjure violence. It is in this spirit that we had offered to talk to the representatives of the All Parties’ Hurriyat Conference."

== Collapse ==
The talks and peace process, however, collapsed and no signatures were attained for the Agra treaty. The talks faced a number of obstacles. According to the Indian scholar, Gaurav Kampani, there were three major reasons for the Indian government's reluctance in accepting Pakistan's assurances at face value. First, the Vajpayee government did not trust President Pervez Musharraf and the establishment that he represents in Delhi. In India alone, it was widely felt that it was Musharraf who sabotaged joint peace efforts of Pakistan Prime minister Navaz Sharif and Indian Prime Minister Atal Bihari Vajpayee at the Lahore Summit in 1999. Second, India was not satisfied with Pakistan's pledge to halt cross-border infiltrations; thirdly the Indian government had plans for holding regional elections in Indian Kashmir in October 2002. Similarly, Indian leadership considered Musharraf's refusal to give up support to the cross-border insurgency in Kashmir as the reason behind the failure of the Agra Summit in June 2001.

Despite the failure of the talks, General Pervez Musharraf joined Vajpayee to call on the two countries to bury their past. He also invited the Indian Prime Minister to visit Pakistan as he felt that the issues between Pakistan and India were much more complicated and could not be resolved in a short time.

Following the August 2001 Agra summit, India reiterated the necessity of implementing the Simla Agreement and the Lahore Declaration. It said that India would support the Simla Agreement, the Lahore Declaration, and the issue of cross-border terrorism.

On 6 July 2015, A. S. Dulat, former chief of the Research and Analysis Wing, India's external intelligence agency, revealed that L.K. Advani played a role in the collapse of the Agra Summit.
