= Presidency of A. P. J. Abdul Kalam =

Indian presidential administration from 2002 to 2007

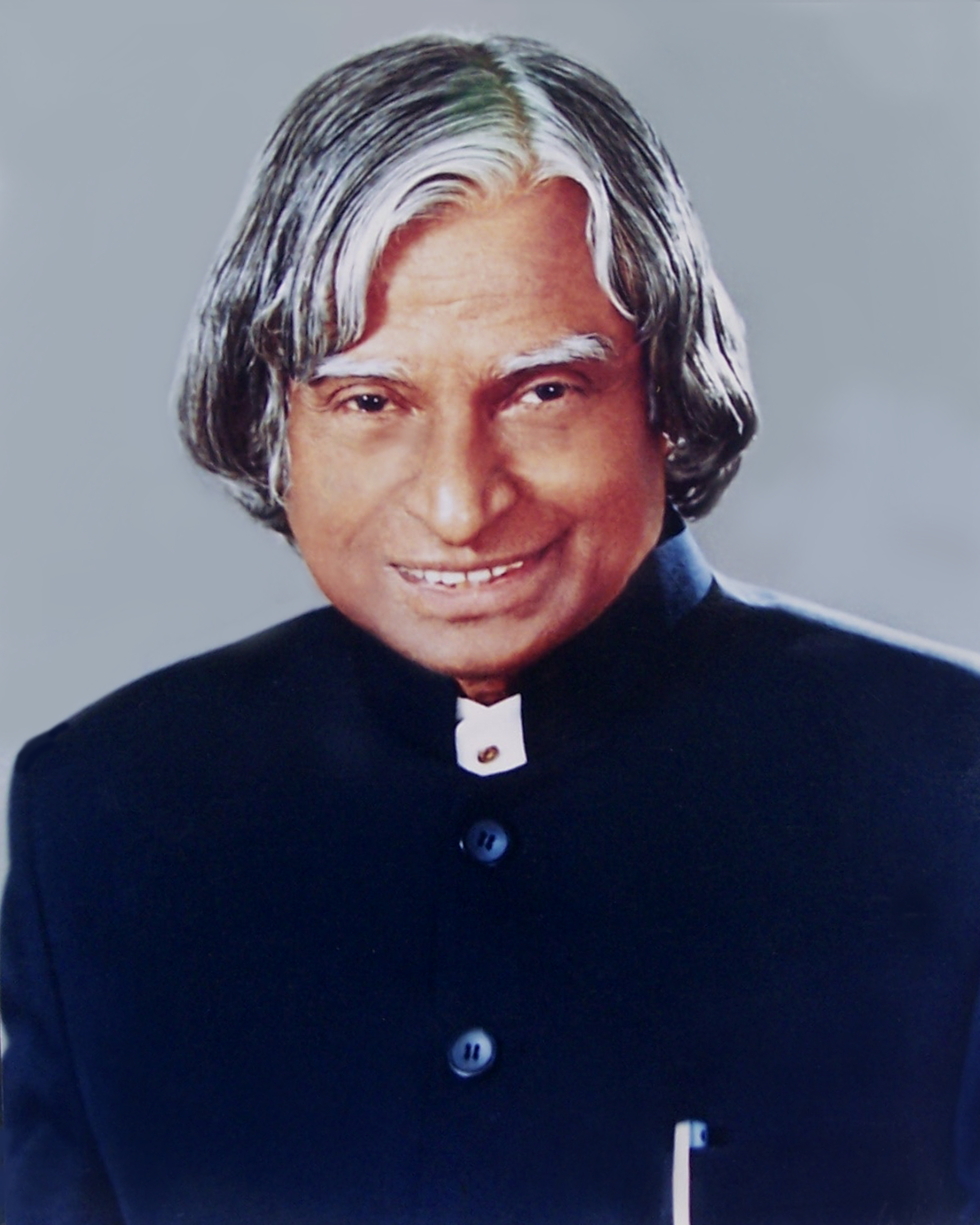
- Presidency of A.P.J. Abdul Kalam; 25 July 2002 – 25 July 2007
- President: A. P. J. Abdul Kalam
- Party: Independent
- Election: 2002 Indian presidential election
- Seat: Rashtrapati Bhawan
- Emblem of India

Presidency of A. P. J. Abdul Kalam was started from 25 July 2002 when Abdul Kalam took oath as the eleventh President of India.

== Domestic affairs ==
=== Gujarat tour ===
In 2002, soon after assuming office, the President announced his decision to visit the state of Gujarat, which had been struck by an earthquake as well as deadly riots. In his book Turning Points, Kalam wrote that he undertook the visit despite Prime Minister Atal Bihari Vajpayee's objections.

=== Return of bill ===
In 2006, Kalam became the first President to return a bill, when he returned the Parliament (Prevention of Disqualification) Amendment Bill, 2006 bill to parliament for reconsideration.

=== Mercy petitions ===
Kalam opposed capital punishment, and sent back nearly 50 cases of capital punishment for reconsideration, listing out reasons why clemency should be considered in each case.

He commuted one death sentence, and rejected only one mercy petition (that of Dhananjoy Chatterjee, who was executed in 2004).

== Foreign affairs ==
=== List of state visits ===
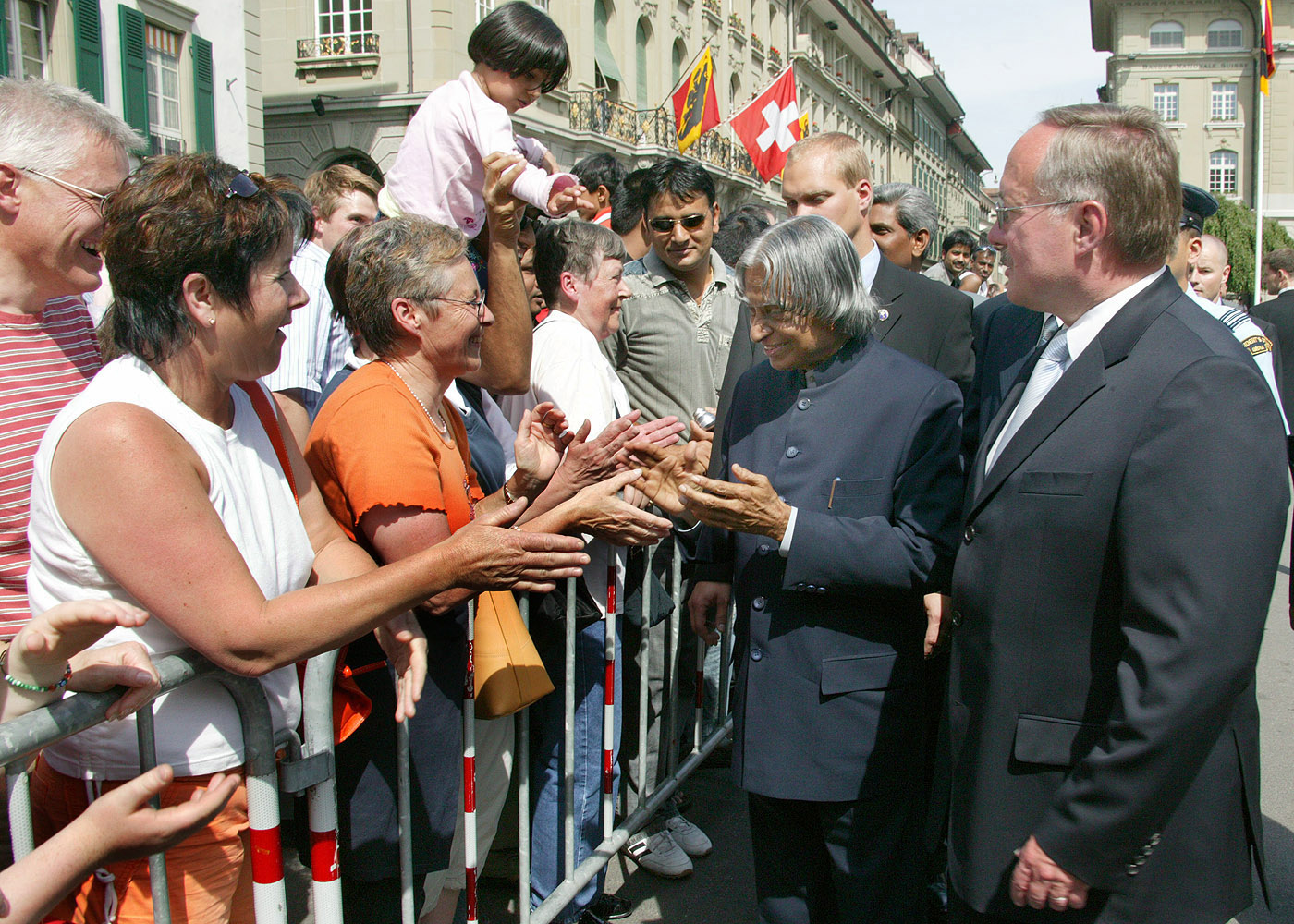
The President Dr. A.P. J. Abdul Kalam and the President of Switzerland Samuel Schmid meeting the Swiss nationals gathered alongside the sidewalks of city of Berne to greet them, at Berne in Switzerland on 27 May 2005

Year	Country	Date	Note	Ref
2003	United Arab Emirates			
2003	Sudan			
2003	Bulgaria			
2005	Switzerland			
2005	Iceland			
2006	Singapore			
2006	Philippines			
2006	South Korea			
2006	Myanmar			
2006	Mauritius			
2007	France			
2007	Greece			

== See also ==
- Premiership of Atal Bihari Vajpayee
