= Praveer Ranjan =

Indian IPS officer

Director General of Central Industrial Security Force
- Incumbent
- Assumed office 1 October 2025
- Preceded by: Rajwinder Singh Bhatti

Personal details
- Born: 28 July 1969 (age 57)
- Occupation: IPS
- Police career
- Allegiance: India
- Department: Central Industrial Security Force
- Service years: 1993–present
- Rank: Director General

Praveer Ranjan (born 28 July 1969) is an IPS officer (1993 Batch) of the AGMUT cadre. He is currently serving as the Director General of Central Industrial Security Force since 1 October 2025.
