= CISF Unit Delhi Metro Rail Corporation =

CISF unit - DMRC

CISF Unit Delhi Metro Rail Corporation केऔसुब इकाई दिल्ली मेट्रो रेल कॉर्पोरेशन
- Logo of CISF
- Abbreviation: CISF Unit DMRC
- Motto: Protection and Security

Agency overview
- Formed: 2007
- Employees: 12,528 (sanctioned strength)

Jurisdictional structure
- Federal agency: IN
- Operations jurisdiction: Delhi, IN
- Governing body: Ministry of Home Affairs (India)
- General nature: Federal law enforcement

Operational structure
- Headquarters: Shastri Park, Delhi
- Agency executive: mr AKHILESH KUMAR IPS, Deputy Inspector General
- Parent agency: Central Industrial Security Force

CISF Unit Delhi Metro Rail Corporation (abbreviated as CISF Unit DMRC) is a Central Industrial Security Force (CISF) unit responsible for providing security cover to Delhi Metro, Delhi, India. The Unit is headed by a Deputy Inspector General who is an Indian Police Service officer; the incumbent is mr AKHILESH KUMAR, a 2007 IPS officer from AGMUT cadre. The Headquarters of the Unit is situated at Shastri Park near Delhi IT Park. It is the single largest unit of CISF in the country with sanctioned strength of 12,528 personnel. The Unit operates two control rooms for better monitoring and coordination and has different specialised wings such as the Quick Reaction Team, Dog Squad and Bomb Detection Squad.

== Induction ==
Delhi Metro is a rapid transit system serving Delhi and its satellite cities in the National Capital Region since the inauguration of its first line in 2002. Initially the security coverage to the Delhi Metro network was provided by the Delhi Police until 2007. However, on 15 April 2007 the Ministry of Home Affairs, Government of India, handed over the security of metro to the Central Industrial Security Force. The Unit provides security and protection to all the metro stations, depots and railway substations.

== Security threats in Delhi Metro ==
Delhi Metro has a large network of 10 different lines consisting of 253 stations with track length 347.66 km (216.03 mi). Even though crime rate, including pickpocketing, walking on the metro track and carrying illegal arms and ammunition, in the metro system is rising but the manpower to provide security is not enough. The present deployed strength of the CISF Unit DMRC is of around 9,000 personnel out of which 7,000 are posted and rest are on 'internal security' duty. In 2019, the Ministry of Home Affairs approved 5,000 additional personnel for the Unit. With the sanctioned strength of total 12,528 personnel, the Unit has become the largest single-unit under the security cover of the CISF in the country.

== Security coverage ==
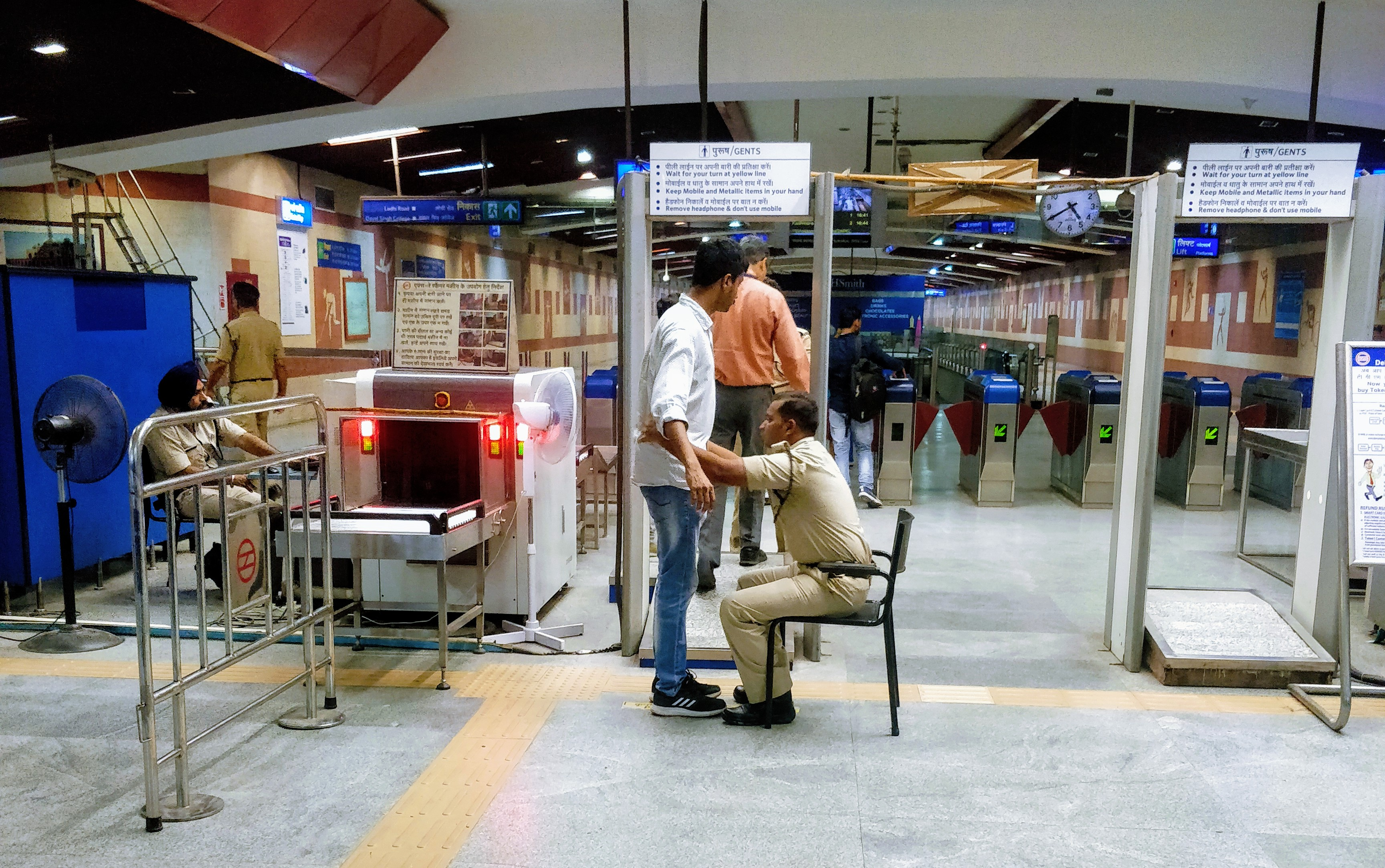
Security point of CISF at Jawaharlal Nehru Stadium Metro Station

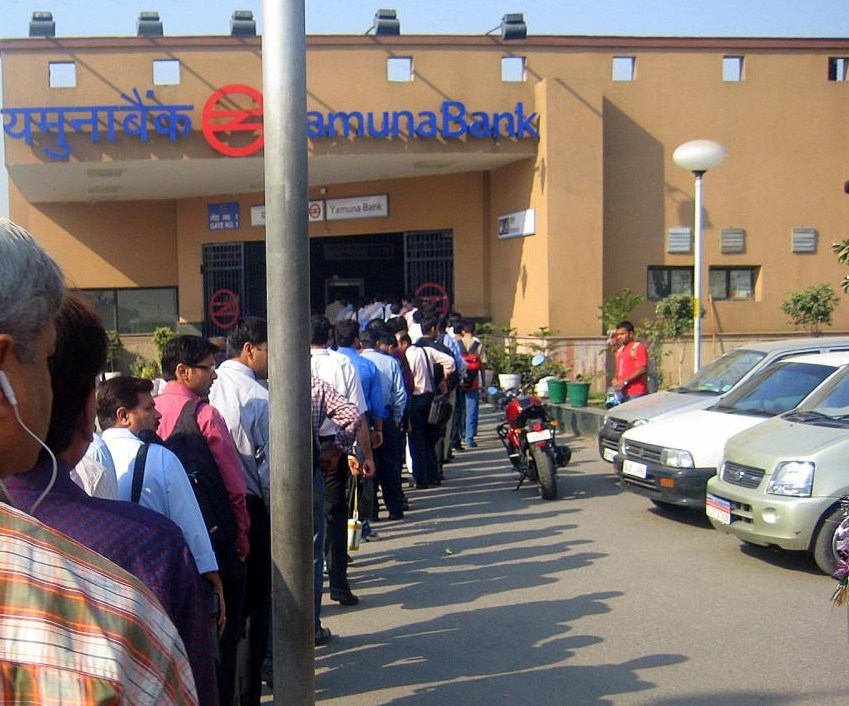
Commuters waiting in a queue for security check at Yamuna Bank

The CISF personnel are responsible for access control of passengers inside the metro stations and each passenger must go through a door frame metal detector (DFMD) before being frisked by a CISF personnel. Double-layered frisking is carried out when threat perception is high like on the national days viz the Independence and the Republic Day in which a commuter is also frisked even before entering the DFMD.

The Unit operates two centralised control rooms, Operational Control Centres (OCC), at Barakhamba Road and Shastri Park that are connected with CCTV cameras installed across the Delhi Metro network for better monitoring and coordination. The control rooms are the centres where important information is gathered from the different locations across the network and communicated to the senior officials and the subsequent orders on urgent matters and relevant information are passed over to the respective officers deployed in the field.

Periodic security mock drills are carried out by the Unit at stations and on trains to ensure preparedness and coordination of different agencies – DMRC, police, fire brigade and medical service – during potential emergency situations.

Several Quick Reaction Teams (QRTs) are deployed by the Unit to counter any potential man-made threat to the security of the metro system. On average five stations are assigned as area of responsibility to each QRT and it keeps swinging between these stations focusing especially in the area excluded from paid area of a metro station.

A special Dog Squad Wing headed by an inspector-rank officer is maintained by the Unit which employs more than 60, mostly female, sniffer dogs of five breeds: Labrador Retriever, German Shepherds, Cocker Spaniels, Golden Retriever and Belgian Malinois. All the dogs are kept at Unit's kennel in Shastri Park and each one of them is cared and managed by its designated handler of the rank of head constable or constable who receives at least two months of basic training in this regard. The dogs undergo training at either Border Security Force's National Training Center for Dogs, Tekanpur or Central Reserve Police Force's Dog Breeding And Training School, Bangalore. They are trained to assist the personnel in detecting arms, explosives and narcotics. These dogs are considered part of the force and treated as sepoy with four-hour working shift in a day. After a service of 10 years the dogs get retired and the Unit gives them up for adoption through NGOs without any charges.

The Bomb Detection Squad (BDS) Wing of the Unit equipped with required electronic devices has a responsibility to detect any potential explosives or IEDs. The vehicle-borne BDS teams regularly conduct anti-sabotage checks in the metro network. As per the standard operating procedure for dealing with any unattended bag or item in the metro premises, the BDS team is called whenever any such article is found.
