= Non-Nuclear Aggression Agreement =

Bilateral treaty between India and Pakistan

Agreement Between India and Pakistan on the Prohibition of Attack against Nuclear Installations and Facilities
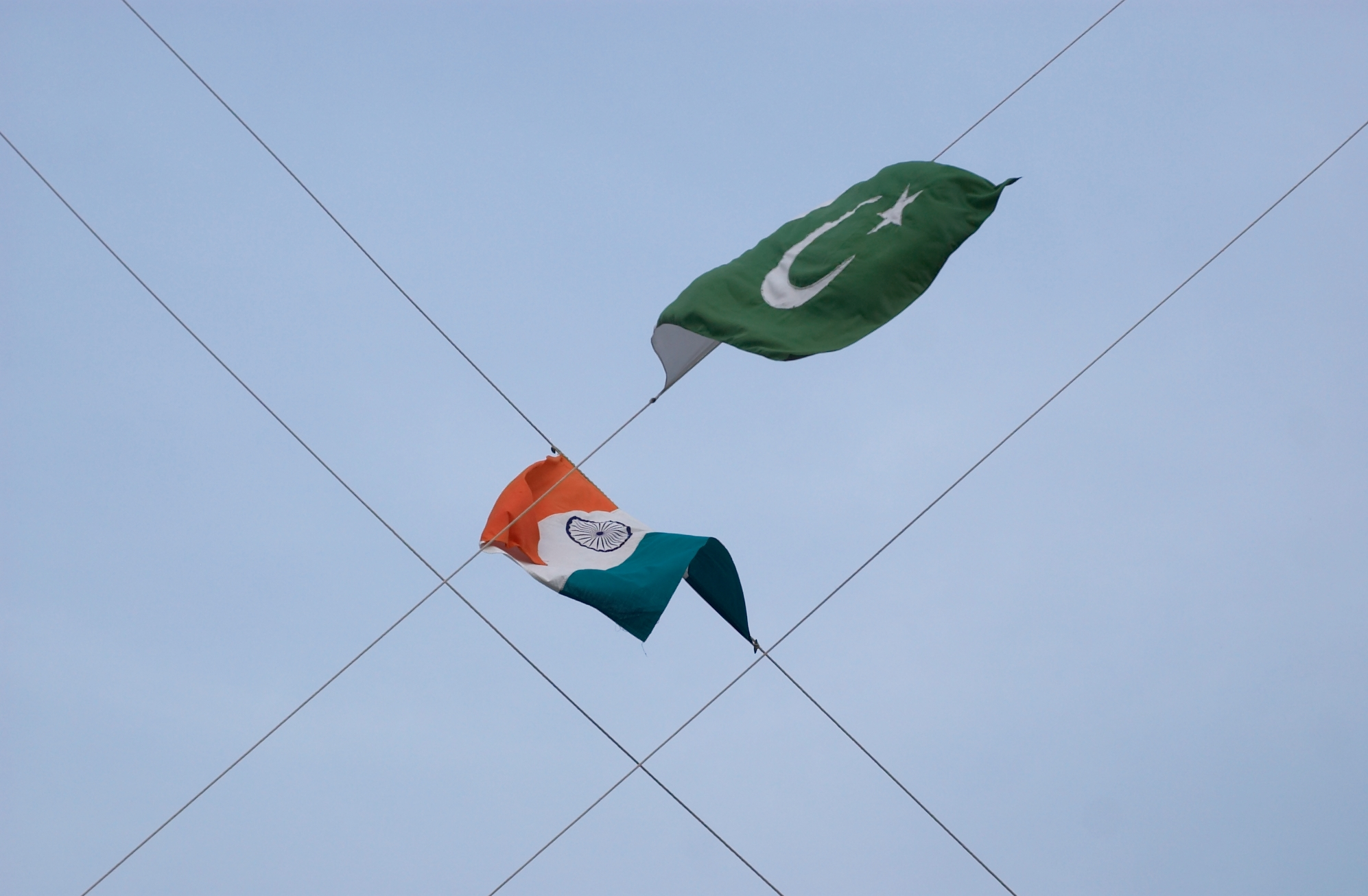
- Flags of India and Pakistan, 2012
- Type: Strategic nuclear reduction, control and avoidance of subsequent nuclear conflicts
- Context: Cold War
- Drafted: 30 November 1988 (1988-11-30)
- Signed: 21 December 1988; 37 years ago
- Location: Islamabad, Pakistan
- Effective: 1 January 1991
- Condition: Ratification of both parties
- Expiration: in effect
- Mediators: Federal Ministry of Science and Technology (Pakistan); Ministry of Science and Technology (India)
- Negotiators: Ministry of External Affairs (India); Ministry of Foreign Affairs (Pakistan)
- Signatories: Rajiv Gandhi (Prime Minister of India); Benazir Bhutto (Prime Minister of Pakistan)
- Parties: India; Pakistan
- Ratifiers: Parliament of India; Parliament of Pakistan
- Depositary: Government of Pakistan
- Languages: Hindi; Urdu; English

The Non-Nuclear Aggression Agreement (NNAA) is a bilateral and nuclear weapons-control treaty signed between India and Pakistan on 21 December 1988 in Islamabad, the capital of Pakistan. It sought to reduce (or limit) nuclear arms and both states pledged not to attack or assist foreign powers to attack each's nuclear installations and facilities. The treaty was drafted in 1988, and signed by the Prime Minister Benazir Bhutto and her Indian counterpart, Rajiv Gandhi on 21 December 1988; it entered into force in January 1991.

The treaty barred its signatories to carry out a surprise attack (or to assist foreign power to attack) on each other's nuclear installations and facilities. The treaty provides a confidence-building security measure environment and refrained each party from "undertaking, encouraging, or participating directly or indirectly, any action aimed at causing destruction or damage to any nuclear installation or facility in each country". Starting in January 1992, India and Pakistan have annually exchanged lists of their respective military and civilian nuclear-related facilities.

== Historical context ==
In 1986–87, the massive exercise, Brasstacks was carried out by the Indian Army, raising the fears of Indian attack on Pakistan's nuclear facilities. Since then, the Foreign ministries of both countries had been negotiating to reach an understanding towards the control of nuclear weapons.

After the 1988 general elections, Prime minister Benazir Bhutto extended the invitation of Indian Prime Minister Rajiv Gandhi. On 21 December 1988, Indian Prime Minister Rajiv Gandhi paid a state visit to Pakistan and met with Prime Minister Benazir Bhutto in Islamabad. Further discussion brought the negotiations to an end on 21 December 1988, in Islamabad, when Prime Minister Benazir Bhutto and Prime minister Rajiv Gandhi signed the "Non-Nuclear Attack Agreement". The treaty was ratified by the parliaments of India and Pakistan on ratified on 27 January 1991. The first list of India and Pakistan's nuclear installations was swapped between two nations on 1 January 1992.

== Government sources ==
- Public Domain. "India-Pakistan Non-Attack Agreement". Work of Governments of India and Pakistan. Published by Nuclear Threat Initiatives (NTI).
