= Murder of Pradyuman Thakur =

Murder case in India

Death of Pradyuman Thakur
- Date: 8 September 2017
- Time: 8:05 AM
- Venue: Ryan International School, Gurugram
- Location: Gurugram, Haryana, India; 28.45°N 77.05°E
- Cause: Homicide by slitting to throat
- Motive: To delay the parents meeting and school examination
- First reporter: Unnamed students
- Outcome: Death of a class 2 student
- Deaths: 1
- Arrests: 1
- Suspects: 2

Pradyuman Thakur was a seven-year-old student at Ryan International School, in Gurugram, in the state of Haryana, India. He was found with injuries to his neck outside a washroom at the school on 8 September 2017, and he later succumbed to his wounds. A school bus driver who provided assistance with carrying the injured Pradyuman was initially charged with the murder, and allegedly confessed to police, but was later found to be innocent. Four police officers were later charged with framing him for the murder. Following a transfer of the case to the Central Bureau of Investigation, an unnamed sixteen-year-old student from the same school has since been charged with his murder. The case is ongoing, with the accused granted bail as of Oct 22, 2022.

Thakur's death attracted widespread public concern and criticism for the conditions regarding safety in schools in India. A number of government reviews of Ryan International School's functioning were conducted following the investigation into Thakur's death, and revised guidelines for safety in schools were issued by both, the State and the Union governmental bodies.

== Murder ==
On 8 September 2017, Barun Chandra Thakur drove his 7-year-old child, Pradyuman, and 11-year-old daughter Vidhi, to Ryan International School, in Gurugram, Haryana, where both children were students. Thakur later stated that he had begun driving his children to school instead of sending them by school bus, because of safety concerns.

Thakur left his children at the school gates at 7:55 a.m. At 8:08 a.m., several students alerted school staff that Pradyuman had been injured, and was bleeding from two neck wounds, outside a washroom near his classroom, on the ground floor of the building. Staff members asked a school bus conductor, Ashok Kumar, to assist them with carrying Pradyuman to a car belonging to one of the school teachers, and drove Pradyuman to a nearby hospital in Badshahpur. He was transferred from there to Artemis Hospital in Gurugram, where he was declared dead on arrival.

Pradyuman's parents, Barun and Jhyoti Thakur, were contacted by the school authorities after he was found, at 8:15 a.m, and went directly to the hospital where he had been taken. They later stated to press that school officials had not informed them about the injuries their son had suffered, and that the police had not been called by the school, but instead had been called by themselves.

Several hundreds attended the last rites for Pradyuman, who was cremated with police protection, in Gurugram.

== Investigation ==
=== Haryana police investigation ===
==== Initial investigation and arrest of Ashok Kumar ====
The Haryana State Police were alerted about the incident by Pradyuman's parents, and arrived at the school at 11:30 AM on the same day. Police officials stated to media that a blood stained knife was recovered from the area where Pradyuman was found, and a police forensics team examined the area and collected evidence, including fingerprints, from the area. CCTV footage recovered from the hallway near the scene of the crime showed Pradyuman attempting to crawl out of the washroom, while bleeding from the neck, before collapsing in the hallway. Police detained and questioned ten persons, and observed blood stains on the shirt of Ashok Kumar, the school bus conductor who had assisted with carrying Pradyuman to a car which took him to the hospital. A cellphone video recorded by a witness at the scene of the crime showed school authorities asking Kumar to help pick up Pradyuman to transport him to the hospital. Kumar was arrested by the Haryana Police in connection with the murder at 12 noon, on the same day.

The Deputy Commissioner of Police, Sumit Kumar, stated that Kumar had arrived with a school bus at 7:50 AM and had gone to the ground floor washroom in the school building, which was commonly used by staff and students. According to the police, he was carrying a knife that he had found in the bus tool kit, and had gone to the washroom to rinse off the knife before taking it home for his own use. When Pradyuman entered the washroom, the police suggested that Kumar attempted to sexually assault Pradyuman, and on meeting with resistance, had attempted to murder him with the knife, which was left behind at the scene of the crime. Haryana Police also initially told a Gurugram court that they believed an additional suspect was involved, and that an attempt had been made to tamper with the crime scene. However, this statement was contradicted by a senior police official who stated to the press that "Only Ashok has murdered Pradyuman, no other person is involved." Police officials alleged that Kumar had confessed to the murder while in custody.

==== Release of Ashok Kumar ====
The arrest of Kumar was met with public doubts and concern, including from Pradyuman Thakur's family. Thakur's mother stated later that she had believed the conductor was being framed. Saurabh Raghav, a bus driver working for Ryan International School on the bus which Ashok Kumar conducted, later stated that he was pressured by the Gurugram Police to state that the knife found at the scene of the murder was part of the bus tool kit. A medical examination of Pradyuman Thakur's body ruled out any sexual assault. Another witness, a school gardener named Harpal Singh, who was one of the first on the scene to find Pradyuman, stated that he had not seen any bloodstains on Kumar's clothes before he assisted with picking up Pradyuman to take him to hospital. Harpal Singh also stated that he had also been repeatedly physically assaulted by the police in an attempt to force him to confess to the murder.

Kumar maintained publicly that he was innocent and had not committed the murder. He later stated that he had been tortured by the Haryana Police while in custody, and that he had confessed to prevent being further tortured. Kumar stated that he was denied food for two days while in custody, and was repeatedly slapped and beaten by police officials.

On 15 September 2017, the case was transferred to the Central Bureau of Investigation, a federal investigative agency, after Pradyuman's parents petitioned the state government and the Supreme Court of India. The CBI assumed custody of the persons arrested by the Haryana Police, including Kumar, and reopened the investigation. On 7 November 2017, the CBI arrested an unnamed student for the murder of Pradyuman Thakur. The Central Bureau of Investigation subsequently cleared Kumar of any involvement in the murder.

Following this, on 22 November 2017, Kumar was granted bail by a District Court in Gurugram. On 28 February 2018, Kumar was acquitted of all charges relating to the murder of Pradyuman Thakur by a special court.

At the time of Kumar's arrest, a Bar Association of lawyers in Gurugram had passed a resolution stating that its members would not defend Kumar against the accusations of murder of Pradyuman Thakur. The Bar Association subsequently retracted their position when he was released on bail after being cleared by the CBI. Kumar's family stated that he had eventually been able to obtain legal representation after reaching out through personal connections. The Supreme Court subsequently disciplined the Bar Association for this resolution.

Following Ashok Kumar's release, the Haryana Police stated that while Ashok Kumar had been arrested as part of an ongoing investigation, and that no charges had been filed against him at the time. The National Human Rights Commission ordered the Haryana Police to compensate Kumar for the wrongful arrest, but he declined to accept, terming the compensation to be insufficient. Kumar has sought legal action against the police officers who arrested him. In January 2021, four police officers of the Gurugram Police were charged with framing Ashok Kumar, by the Central Bureau of Investigation. The charges including offences relating to falsifying documents, torture, and criminal conspiracy. They have not yet been arrested on these charges, as of November 2021.

=== CBI investigation ===
==== Transfer of investigation to CBI ====
The initial investigation of the murder by Gurugram Police was met with wide public criticism, including by Pradyuman's father, Barun Thakur. Barun Thakur filed a petition at the Supreme Court, asking for the investigation to be transferred to the Central Bureau of Investigation (CBI). On 15 September 2017, Haryana Chief Minister Manohar Lal Khattar announced that the case had been transferred to the CBI in response to requests by the parents of Pradyuman Thakur, although he affirmed that in his view, the investigation had been correctly handled by the Haryana Police. The Haryana Police also denied any mishandling of the investigation, stating that their findings were preliminary and that the investigation had still been ongoing when it was transferred to the CBI. Pradyuman Thakur's family stated that they had asked the CBI to investigate the possibility of the involvement of other students at the school in Pradyuman's death, as they had received information that some older students had consumed alcohol in the presence of younger students and had threatened the younger students to prevent them from telling school authorities.

==== Investigation ====
The CBI sent a forensic team to the school to review the evidence and scene of crime independently from the Haryana Police investigation on 22 September 2017 . They took over custody of the persons arrested by the Haryana Police. Following their investigation, the CBI identified a different knife as the murder weapon, stating that they had recovered it from the scene of the crime and that it had been hidden inside one of the washrooms. This contradicted the Haryana Police's statement that a knife recovered at the scene of the crime, and identified as part of the school bus tool kit, was the murder weapon. The CBI also reviewed CCTV footage from the crime scene and found that there were some students visible in the footage apart from Pradyuman Thakur. The CBI worked with the school administration to identify these students and then questioned them. They re-examined forensic evidence and found no evidence that Ashok Kumar, the bus conductor arrested by the Haryana Police, was involved in the murder. A forensic investigation by the CBI found that Pradyuman's body had bloodstains that were not matched to himself, and that Kumar was also ruled out forensically as a match. The CBI also stated that the Haryana Police's claim that a semen sample had been found on Pradyuman's body and had been sent for testing could not be confirmed, and that they could not find any evidence that such a sample had been found or tested.

==== Arrest of unnamed student for murder ====
On 7 November 2017, the CBI arrested an unnamed class XI student, aged 16, from Ryan International School for Pradyuman Thakur's murder. The student was one of the first on the scene of the crime, and had informed school authorities that another student had been injured. The Haryana Police later stated that while they had questioned the unnamed student as a witness immediately after the murder, they had found no evidence suggesting that he was responsible for the death of Pradyuman Thakur at the time.

Following the arrest of the unnamed student, the Juvenile Justice Board, a state body constituted under the Juvenile Justice Act to determine whether juveniles arrested of offenses should be tried as children or adults, gave the CBI permission to interrogate the student. Based on CCTV footage, the CBI questioned the unnamed student, who could be seen on the footage exiting the washroom around the time that the crime was committed. The CBI also stated later that cellphone records and forensic evidence were used in order to identify the student. Following the arrest, the CBI also took the arrested unnamed student back to the school and recreated the scene of the crime. The CBI stated that they were able to establish that the knife recovered from the washroom had been purchased by the unnamed student at a local market, a few days earlier. They also seized his computer and phone and stated that the student's social media was being investigated for evidence regarding the crime.

The CBI further stated to a Juvenile Court in Gurugram that on questioning, the unnamed student had confessed to the murder, in the presence of his father, independent witnesses, and a juvenile welfare officer. The CBI stated that the student had not been performing well academically, and had been unable to write a scheduled exam on the day of the murder. He was also reported to have three more examinations and a parent-teacher meeting scheduled for that week. A statement from the CBI indicated that they believed the unnamed student killed Pradyuman to postpone his examinations and parent-teacher meetings at the school. A CBI official stated to the press that the student "...believed that a sensational act would either force the school to shut down for a few days or create enough disruption to cancel the exams and the parent-teacher meeting." The CBI has initially stated that they believe that the choice of victim was random. The unnamed student was later quoted confirming to the Juvenile Justice Board that he knew Pradyuman as they attended the same music class. The unnamed student's father has subsequently accused the CBI of torturing their son in order to elicit a false confession from him.

=== Arrest of school authorities for negligence ===
Following the murder of Pradyuman Thakur, parents of several students filed a police complaint stating that the school had been negligent in maintaining security measures, and particularly pointed out a collapsed boundary wall that allowed access to school grounds, as well as several dysfunctional CCTVs on the school premises, resulting in the arrest of several school officials. A team of Haryana Police travelled to Mumbai to investigate the owners of Ryan International School.

The founders of the Ryan Group of Schools, Augustine and Grace Pinto, and their son, Ryan Pinto, applied for and were denied anticipatory bail at the Bombay High Court, with Pradyuman Thakur's father filing an application to the court opposing their plea. They were also denied anticipatory bail from the Punjab and Haryana High Court. On appeal to the Supreme Court, senior officials and owners of the Ryan International School were granted a bail order, and the Supreme Court described the proceedings against them as a 'media trial'. Ryan International School management made a motion to the Supreme Court to transfer the case outside Haryana to ensure a fair trial. The court began hearing the case on 18 September 2017.

The Central Board of Secondary Education investigated Ryan International School, and reported to the Supreme Court that school authorities had been negligent in maintaining safety and security conditions on the school premises. The CBSE further found that the school had failed to report the incident to the police when it occurred, and that the police had been contacted by the victim's family.

== Trial ==
In order to determine how the trial would proceed, the Juvenile Justice Board set up a committee which included a psychologist from the Pandit Bhagwat Dayal Sharma Post Graduate Institute of Medical Sciences (PGIMS, Rohtak) for an expert opinion on the accused unnamed student. On 11 November 2017, the unnamed student was placed in a juvenile home for observation, following an order from a juvenile court in Gurugram. The Court had also appointed a welfare officer to act as a liaison for the unnamed student. The Juvenile Justice Board is responsible for determining whether the unnamed student would be tried as an adult or a juvenile. If tried as a juvenile, in accordance with the Juvenile Justice Act 2015, the unnamed student can only be remanded to a correctional facility for youth where he will remain until the age of 21, after which he may be transferred to jail to complete a sentence of punishment. In such a case, he cannot be sentenced to life imprisonment or the death penalty. If tried as an adult, he would face the normal conditions of trial under the Indian Penal Code and Code of Criminal Procedure.

After conducting evaluations on the unnamed student's mental and physical state, the Juvenile Justice Board declared on 20 December 2017, that he would be treated as an adult and undergo a regular trial in court. The Juvenile Justice Board noted that the student "...had the adequate ability to understand the consequences of his acts." The Board had also ordered an investigation into the unnamed student's conduct, based on allegations that his behavior in school had been "aggressive". The Board also heard an application from Pradyuman Thakur's family, asking that the unnamed student be tried as an adult.

In 2018, the Punjab and Haryana High Court heard an appeal against the decision of the JJB to have the unnamed student tried as an adult. They remanded the matter back to the JJB for reconsideration. An appeal was filed against this decision at the Supreme Court, which stayed all proceedings in the case until it had determined the question of whether the student should be tried as a juvenile or adult. As of November 2021, the trial proceedings are yet to begin, as the Supreme Court has not made a decision in this regard. In October 2022, the Supreme Court granted interim bail to the unnamed accused.

== Public response ==
The news of Pradyuman's murder resulted in protests by parents at the Ryan International School and several people were subsequently arrested for vandalizing school property. Police officials responded with a baton charge on the protesters, and one police official was subsequently suspended in connection with this. Barun Thakur appealed for peace, publicly accused the school of being negligent regarding the safety of the students, and moved the Supreme Court of India for an investigation into the school, as well as for a transfer of the case to the Central Bureau of Investigation. A police force was deployed inside and around the school in response to the anxious parents who barged into the school and began throwing furniture as well as breaking glass awards cases. In response to these protests, the Chief Minister of Haryana, Manohar Lal Khattar, assured parents that strict action would be taken against the criminal.

On 11 September 2017, the Supreme Court issued a notice to the Central Government, the Haryana Government, and the Central Board of Secondary Education after the child's father, Barun Thakur, petitioned for a CBI probe into his son's murder and into the safety guidelines for children in school. Following this, two officials of the Ryan International School were arrested after an investigation pointed out serious security lapses. For example, most of the school's closed-circuit television (CCTV) cameras were not working, and there was no CCTV camera in the area of the incident.

Ryan International School principal was reinstated at another branch after a short suspension. Neerja Batra was placed as a teacher at a school in Gurugram's sector 40 by Deputy Commissioner, Vinay Pratap Singh. This relocation by the administration angered Thakur's parents who called the principal "irresponsible". Since Batra revealed the insufficient security, and had no financial resources to deal with the situation herself, she was deemed not responsible for the murder of the young child.

Due to the incident, many students have come forward with stories of violence conducted by their teachers and principal. As a result, many measures have been taken by the Ryan Group, such as: metal detectors in school, female security guards, bathrooms not being open between school periods, and parents not being allowed to enter the school during school hours.

=== Policies regarding school safety ===
Following the murder of Pradyuman Thakur, the Haryana government instituted a number of policies aimed at improving school safety. Mandatory police checks on school staff, including transport staff were instituted. The Ministry of Human Resources and Development announced an initiative to train school teachers to address mental health issues following the murder.

== In popular culture ==
In 2018, director and screenwriter Vishal Bhardwaj stated that he would be making a film based on the murder of Pradyuman Thakur.

A book named The Mysterious Killer of Class 2 Student written by B. R. Sekar has been published on August 5, 2018. The book contains a similar plot to the incident.The story analyses all aspects of the real case and concludes that it was an accident rather than a murder.

A documentary series named A Big Little Murder directed by Mayurica Biswas was released on Netflix at August 2021. However, The Delhi high court has restrained the platform from showing the documentary. The ruling was done in favor of the Gurugram-based Ryan International School, who pleaded against the streaming of the documentary. The court ruled as "The defendants are restrained from streaming, broadcasting, telecasting etc. the documentary titled "A Big Little Murder" or any of its abridged versions. The court clarify that the defendants may stream the said documentary after deleting all references to the plaintiff school in question and deleting the portion where the building of the school is depicted". As of January 2022, the documentary is now available on Netflix Australia.

Dibakar Banerjee's 2024 anthology film Love Sex Aur Dhokha 2 had a subplot that involved the death of a juvenile kid, which had quite a few similarities with the incident.

== See also ==
- Juvenile delinquency
- Crime in India
- Child murder
- Child abuse
