= Lahore Declaration =

1999 bilateral agreement and governance treaty between India and Pakistan

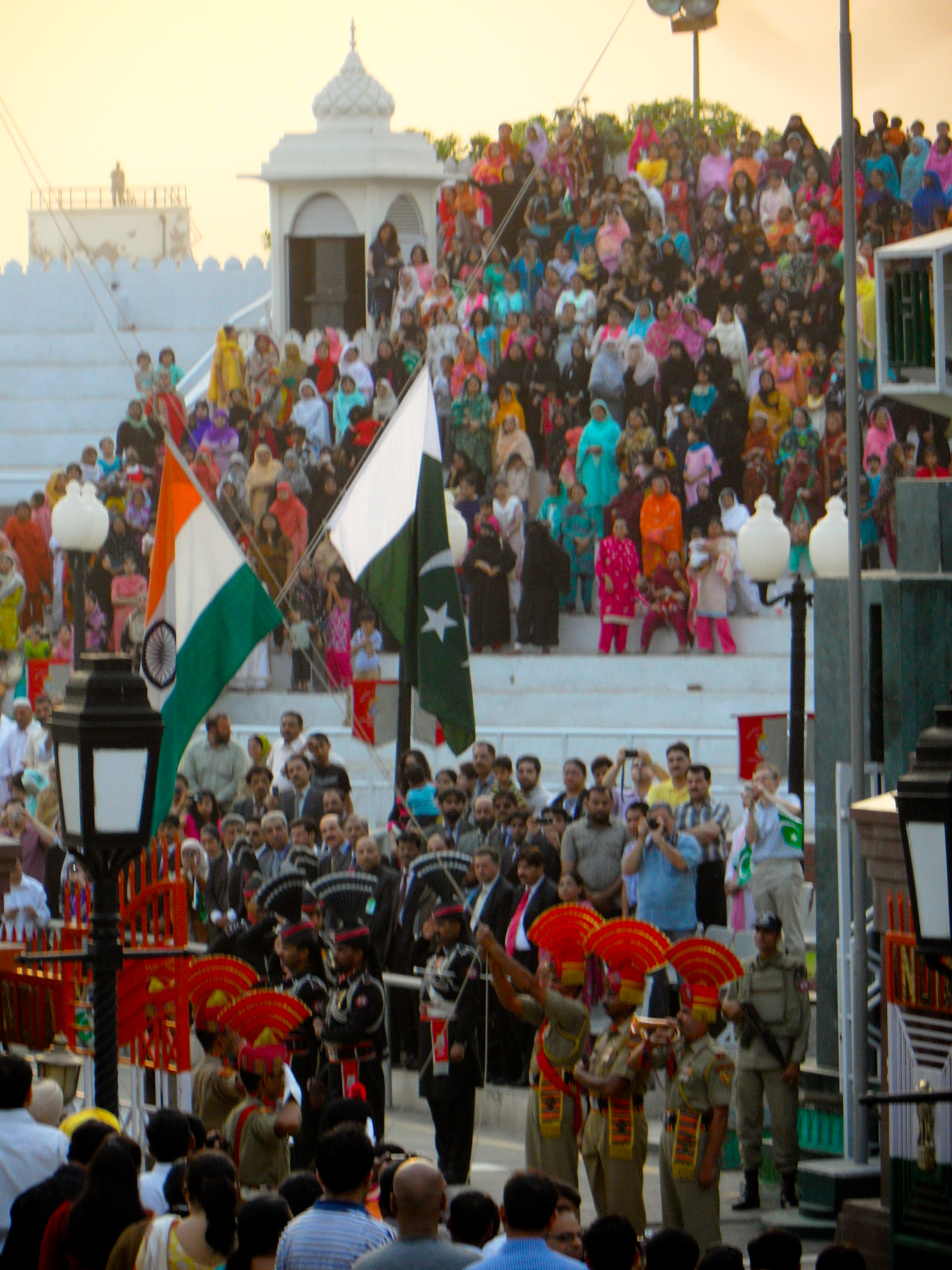
- Official flags of India and Pakistan at the Wagha border. In 1999, Indian Prime minister and the high-profile delegation came to Pakistan from Wagha Border and received by Prime Minister Nawaz Sharif.
- Type: Strategic nuclear governance, control, and law
- Drafted: 19 December 1998 – 19 January 1999 (1 month)
- Signed: 21 February 1999; 27 years ago
- Location: Lahore, Punjab, Pakistan
- Effective: 21 February 1999
- Condition: Ratification of both parties
- Expiration: none (in effect)
- Negotiators: Minister of External Affairs of India; Ministry of Foreign Affairs of Pakistan
- Signatories: Atal Bihari Vajpayee (Prime Minister of India); Nawaz Sharif (Prime Minister of Pakistan)
- Parties: India; Pakistan
- Ratifiers: Parliament of India; Parliament of Pakistan
- Languages: English

The Lahore Declaration was a bilateral agreement and governance treaty signed between India and Pakistan on 21 February 1999 in Lahore, the capital of Punjab, Pakistan. The signing of the declaration took place at the conclusion of a historic summit in Lahore, and was ratified by the parliaments of both countries the same year.

Under the terms of the treaty, a mutual understanding was reached towards the development of atomic arsenals and to avoid accidental and unauthorised operational use of nuclear weapons. The Lahore Declaration brought added responsibility to both nations' leadership towards avoiding nuclear race, as well as both non-conventional and conventional conflicts. This event was significant in the history of Pakistan and it provided both countries an environment of mutual confidence. In a much-covered televised press conference in both countries, Prime Minister Nawaz Sharif and Prime Minister Atal Bihari Vajpayee signed the treaty. It was the second nuclear control treaty signed by both countries and pledged to continue the use of the first treaty, NNAA, was signed in 1988. The Lahore treaty was quickly ratified by the parliaments of India and Pakistan and came into force the same year.

The Lahore Declaration signalled a major breakthrough in overcoming the historically strained bilateral relations between the two nations in the aftermath of the publicly performed atomic tests carried out by both nations in May 1998. Widely popular in the public circles in Pakistan and hailed by the international community, the relations would very soon lose impetus after infiltration of Pakistan forces into Kargil, which led to the outbreak of the 1999 Indo-Pakistan War in May 1999.

== Overview ==
The Lahore treaty was one of the most important and historical treaties of India and Pakistan to normalise the relations to ease up the military tensions in South Asia. In 1972, the Simla Treaty was acceded to establish peaceful relations in the aftermath of the war in 1971 and committed both nations to resolving bilateral disputes by peaceful dialogue and co-operation. In 1978, Pakistan made a proposal to limit the nuclear race between two countries and to establish South Asia Nuclear Weapon Free Zone (SANWFZ), for which negotiations were never concluded.

In 1988, Pakistan and India reached an important understanding towards controlling the nuclear weapons, and signed the NNAA treaty. Despite many proposals, the nuclear race continued and the cold war had been heightened over the issue of Kashmir. The domestic pressure and the increasingly political momentum made India conduct nuclear tests (see: Operation Shakti) in May 1998, in spite of international pressure. Responding to India's test, Pakistan equalised the nuclear magnitude in South Asia after performing its own series of atomic tests, (see: Chagai-I), all at the end of the month of May 1998. The tests invited condemnation and economic sanctions on both countries and many in the international community fear that in wake of intensified conflict, it could lead to a nuclear war.

=== Negotiations ===
In 1998, the Foreign ministries of both countries had been initiating peace process to ease up the tension in the region. On 23 September 1998 both governments signed an agreement recognising the principle of building an environment of peace and security and resolving all bilateral conflicts, which became the basis of the Lahore Declaration. On 11 February 1999, the Pakistan Foreign Office announced the state visit of Indian Prime minister Atal Bihari Vajpayee aboard the maiden bus service between the two countries.

Before the arrival of Indian Prime Minister, a warm welcome awaited Indian Prime Minister Vajpayee when he arrived at Wagah by the inaugural bus service between New Delhi and Lahore. He was received by Prime Minister Nawaz Sharif and the units of Pakistan Army gave the Indian Prime minister a guard of honour. It embarked on a historic visit to Pakistan, travelling on the inaugural bus service connecting the Indian capital of New Delhi with the major Pakistani city of Lahore, establishing a major transport link for the peoples of both nations. The inaugural bus also carried Indian celebrities and dignitaries such as Dev Anand, Satish Gujral, Javed Akhtar, Kuldip Nayar, Kapil Dev, Shatrughan Sinha and Mallika Sarabhai. He was received amidst great fanfare and media attention at the Pakistani border post of Wagah by Pakistan Prime minister Nawaz Sharif, with whom he had been at loggerheads a year before over the nuclear tests controversy. The summit was hailed worldwide as a major breakthrough and milestone in bilateral relations and a historic step towards ending conflict and tensions in the region.

=== Drafting and Signatures ===
The Lahore declaration is one notable treaty after the 1988 NNAA treaty and the 1972 Shimla Treaty. After the two Prime ministers signed the agreement, the foreign secretaries of Pakistan Shamshad Ahmad and India K. Raghunath signed an MoU on 21 February 1999, identifying measures aimed at promoting an environment of peace and security between the two countries. The MOU reaffirmed the continued commitment of their respective governments to the principles and purposes of the UN Charter.

The MoU reiterated the determination of both countries to implementing the Simla Agreement in letter and spirit; and that an environment of peace and security is in the national interest of both countries and that resolution of all outstanding issues, including Jammu and Kashmir, is essential for this purpose. The parliaments of both countries quickly ratified and acceded the treaties following the signatures.

== Content ==
The Lahore Declaration was signed on 21 February along with a memorandum of understanding (MoU) after three rounds of talks between the Indian and Pakistani leaders. In its content, both governments asserted their commitment to the vision of peace, stability and mutual progress and their full commitment to the Simla Agreement and the UN Charter. Both governments recognised through the Lahore Declaration that the development of nuclear weapons brought added responsibility to both nations towards avoiding conflict and promoted the importance of Confidence-building measures, especially to avoid accidental and unauthorised use of nuclear weapons. India and Pakistan also decided to give each other advance notification of ballistic missile flight tests and accidental or unexplained use of nuclear weapons to avoid the outbreak of a nuclear conflict. Its important inter alia stated:

- Recognizes that the nuclear dimension of the security environment of the two countries adds to their responsibility for avoidance of conflict between them.
- Commits both to the principles and purposes of the Charter of the United Nations, and the universally accepted principles of peaceful co-existence.
- Commits both countries to the objectives of universal nuclear disarmament and nonproliferation.

The Lahore Declaration and the MoU incorporated a joint commitment to intensify efforts to resolve the Kashmir conflict and other dispute, to enhance bilateral dialogue and to implement nuclear safeguards and measures to prevent conflict. Both governments condemned terrorism and committed to non-interference in each other's internal affairs and the objectives of the South Asia Association for Regional Cooperation and promote human rights.

In the joint statement issued after the conclusion of the summit, both governments said that their foreign ministers would meet periodically and consult each other on issues pertaining to the World Trade Organization and information technology. A two-member ministerial committee was to be established to investigate human rights issues, civilian detainees and missing prisoners of war. The Indian Prime Minister thanked his Pakistani counterpart and issued an invitation for a future summit in India.

== Public debates and Reactions ==
=== Pakistan public and media opinion ===
The Lahore treaty was very popular in Pakistan's civil society sphere. The general population polls widely welcomed this move by the Nawaz Sharif Government to normalise relations with India. The news channels, television outlets, and print media widely hailed this move by the Government of Nawaz Sharif to normalise relations with India. Except Jamaat-e-Islami Pakistan, the far-right party was critical of this treaty; all major political forces in Pakistan, including PPP, hailed and congratulated Nawaz Sharif for successfully reaching the Lahore treaty.

However, it was speculated in the Indian news media that many in Pakistan military did not approve of the treaty and consequently worked to subvert it and escalate tensions between the two nations. The reception for Vajpayee, described as the leader of an "enemy-combatant nation," was boycotted by the chiefs of Pakistan military, and those included the Chairman joint chiefs and army chief General Pervez Musharaff, air chief ACM PQ Mehdi and naval chief Admiral Fasih Bokhari.

=== Indian public and media opinion ===
The Lahore Declaration was hailed warmly in India and in the global media and by governments of other nations, forging optimism after the global tensions over the 1998 nuclear tests. The initiative bolstered the popularity of the Vajpayee government in India, cementing his standing as a statesman.

== Aftermath and status ==
The relations between the two nations were completely transformed at the outbreak of the Kargil War in May 1999, following the sudden revelation that Pakistani soldiers had infiltrated into Kashmir; the Indian Army was deployed to evict the Pakistan army soldiers and re-capture the disputed territory. The two-month-long conflict claimed the lives of hundreds of soldiers on both sides and brought both nations close to full-scale war and possible nuclear conflict. After this conflict, the "Lahore Treaty" was stalled and no further discussions took place between the two countries on promoting the dialogue and CBMs initiated at Lahore in February 1999.

The conflict was followed by an Atlantique incident in which the Indian Air Force intercepted and shot down the Pakistan Navy's reconnaissance aircraft; a total of eleven naval personnel were killed. After months of contentious relations with the military and judiciary, a military coup d'état was staged by Pakistan Armed Forces that overthrew the Government of Nawaz Sharif and brought the chairman joint chiefs General Pervez Musharraf, believed to be responsible for the Kargil incursion, to power, thus exacerbating doubts over the future of the relations between the two nations. Despite many political difficulties, India reiterated the necessity of implementing the Simla and Lahore treaties and said India would support the Simla Agreement, Lahore Declaration, and the issue of cross-border terrorism.
