= Premiership of Atal Bihari Vajpayee =

Indian prime minister 1996, 1998 and 1999–2004

Atal Bihari Vajpayee
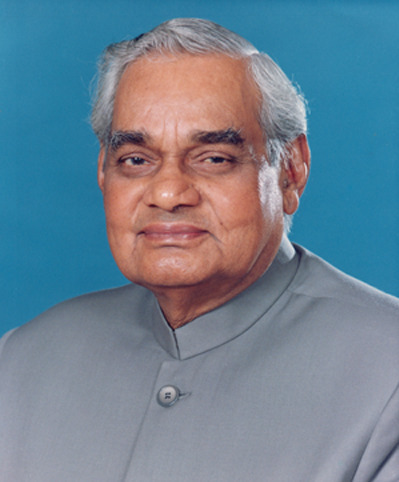

First Term
- In office 16 May 1996 – 1 June 1996
- Preceded by: P.V. Narasimha Rao
- Succeeded by: H.D. Deve Gowda

Second Term
- In office 19 March 1998 – 13 October 1999
- Preceded by: I. K. Gujral
- Succeeded by: Himself

Third Term
- In office 13 October 1999 – 22 May 2004
- Preceded by: Himself
- Succeeded by: Manmohan Singh

Personal details
- Born: 25 December 1924 Gwalior State, British India
- Died: 16 August 2018 (aged 93) New Delhi, India
- Party: Bharatiya Janata Party
- Occupation: Statesman, Poet

Atal Bihari Vajpayee was an Indian statesman who served thrice as Prime Minister of India, first from 16 May to 1 June 1996, from 19 March 1998 to 12 October 1999 and then, from 13 October 1999 to 22 May 2004. A member of the Bharatiya Janata Party (BJP), Vajpayee was the tenth Prime Minister. He headed the BJP-led National Democratic Alliance in the Indian Parliament, and became the first Prime Minister unaffiliated with the Indian National Congress to complete a full five-year term in office. He died at the age of 93 on Thursday 16 August 2018 at 17:05 at AIIMS, New Delhi.

== Formation of government ==
After the 1996 general election, the BJP emerged as the single largest party in the Lok Sabha, the lower house of Parliament. Vajpayee was invited by President Shankar Dayal Sharma to form a government, but after 13 days in office, proved unable to muster a governing majority and resigned. He was succeeded by H. D. Dewe Gowda, leader of the United Front (UF) coalition, and became the Leader of the Opposition.

The United Front was only able to sustain a majority in Parliament until 1998, resigning after the Indian National Congress withdrew its support. In the 1998 Indian general election the BJP again emerged as the single-largest party, but was able to assemble a governing coalition called the National Democratic Alliance (NDA). Other constituents of the NDA included the All India Anna Dravida Munnetra Kazhagam (AIADMK), Bahujan Samaj Party, Shiv Sena, Shiromani Akali Dal, Biju Janata Dal (BJD), National Conference (NC) and the TMC, amongst others.

By early 1999, the NDA government lost its majority after the AIADMK leader J. Jayalalithaa withdrew its support. President K. R. Narayanan dissolved the Parliament and called fresh elections – the third in two years. Public anger against smaller parties that jeopardised the NDA coalition and the wave of support for the Vajpayee government in the aftermath of the Kargil War gave the BJP a larger presence in the Lok Sabha. The NDA won a decisive majority with the support of new constituents such as the Janata Dal (United) and the Dravida Munnetra Kazhagam.

== Economic policy ==
The Vajpayee government expanded the process of economic liberalisation initiated by the P.V. Narasimha Rao government (1991–1996). His government initiated the privatisation of most state corporations, including the Videsh Sanchar Nigam Ltd. His government also began the establishment of special export processing zones, Information Technology and Industrial Parks across the country to bolster industrial production and exports. In its third term (1999–2004), his government launched the National Highway Development Project, with the first phase being the Golden Quadrilateral. In 2003, the government launched the Pravasi Bharatiya Samman (Honouring of Non-Resident Indians) and initiated plans to establish an Overseas citizenship of India to enable NRIs to invest and do business freely in India. His government also expanded efforts to encourage foreign investment, especially from Europe and the United States.

== Foreign policy ==
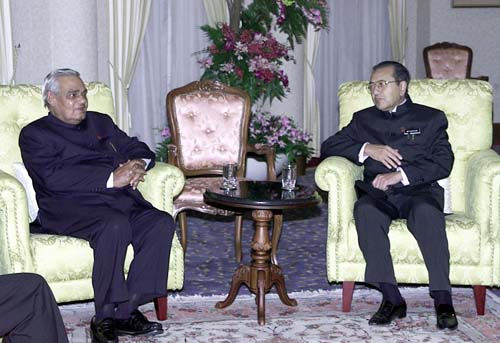
Vajpayee meeting with Malaysian Prime Minister Mahathir Mohamad during the Non-Aligned Movement Summit in Kuala Lumpur, 23 February 2003

The Vajpayee government improved India's ties with the People's Republic of China, boosting trade and seeking the resolution of territorial disputes through dialogue. India also established strategic and military cooperation with Israel, with both nations establishing cooperation in fighting terrorism. In 2000, U.S. President Bill Clinton became the first American president to visit India since Jimmy Carter. The U.S. and India ended the Cold War-era distant relationship and expanded trade and cooperation on strategic issues. After the 11 September 2001 attacks, India provided much strategic assistance to the U.S. in its war against the Taliban and Al-Qaeda.

In 1999, Vajpayee personally travelled to Pakistan on the inaugural Delhi-Lahore Bus, which established a regular road link between the two countries for the first time since 1947. Vajpayee and the then-Pakistani Prime Minister Nawaz Sharif issued the Lahore Declaration, which committed the two nations to resolve bilateral disputes through dialogue and concurrently boost trade. However, the Lahore summit's success was diminished by the outbreak of the Kargil War just months later. In 2001, Vajpayee and Pakistani President Pervez Musharraf held the Agra summit, which failed to produce results and was overshadowed by the 2001-2002 India-Pakistan standoff. In 2003, Vajpayee declared in the Indian Parliament that he was making his final initiative to make peace with Pakistan, and oversaw considerable improvement in relations and a ceasefire between Indian forces and terrorist groups in the state of Jammu and Kashmir.

== National Security ==
=== Pokhran-II nuclear tests ===
In May, 1998 India conducted five underground nuclear tests – Pokhran-II, following the Pokhran-I test of 1974. These tests established India as a nuclear weapons power, although it also resulted in the imposition of limited sanctions by the U.S., UK, Canada and other nations. By 2001, most of these sanctions had been lifted.

=== Kargil War ===
In 1999, two months after the bilateral summit in Lahore, India discovered that Pakistani army disguised as terrorists had infiltrated through the Line of Control (LoC) into the state of Jammu and Kashmir with active Pakistani assistance and participation. In response, the Indian armed forces launched Operation Vijay to evict the infiltrators. By July, 1999 Indian forces had reclaimed territories on its side of the LoC. The Vajpayee government also established the Defence Intelligence Agency to provide better military intelligence and monitor India's border with Pakistan.

=== Terrorism ===
The terrorist attack on the Indian Parliament building on 13 December 2001, conducted by Lashkar-e-Taiba and Jaish-e-Mohammed terrorists led to the death of a dozen people (5 terrorists, 6 police and 1 civilian) and the 2001-2002 India-Pakistan standoff. In response to these attacks and an escalation in terrorist attacks in other parts of India, the NDA government promulgated the Prevention of Terrorism Act. Although a tougher anti-terrorism law than Terrorist and Disruptive Activities (Prevention) Act, POTA was criticised as compromising civil liberties and encouraging profiling of the Indian Muslim community. As the Rajya Sabha, the upper house of Parliament, was controlled by opposition parties, the Vajpayee government called a historic joint session of both houses of the Indian Parliament in order to enact POTA into law.

== Gujarat violence ==
On 27 February 2002, the Sabarmati Express train was attacked at Godhra by a Muslim mob. 59 Hindu pilgrims returning from Ayodhya were killed in the attack. Lasting for over a month, the riots claimed the lives of more than 1,000 people, mostly Muslims. The state government, led by Narendra Modi of the BJP, was severely criticised for being unable or unwilling to stop the violence.

Vajpayee officially condemned the violence. Later Vajpayee made controversial remarks: "Wherever there are Muslims, they do not want to live in peace with others. Instead of living peacefully, they want to propagate their religion by creating terror in the minds of others." According to Sanjay Ruparelia, Vajpayee used Muslim terrorism to justify the violence in Gujarat. Ornit Shani believes that Vajpayee's government believed that Muslim provoked violence against themselves by simply being Muslim.

Vajpayee told that it was his mistake in underestimating the violence and not doing enough to stop it.

K.R. Narayanan, then president of India said that he wrote several letters to Vajpayee asking him to deploy the Indian army to quell the violence. Narayanan didn't speak out against Vajpayee during his term as president.

== See also ==
- First Vajpayee ministry
- Second Vajpayee ministry
- Third Vajpayee ministry
- List of international prime ministerial trips made by Atal Bihari Vajpayee
- Presidency of A. P. J. Abdul Kalam
