= Central Industrial Security Force =

Central police force in India

Central Industrial Security Force (CISF)
- Emblem of the Central Industrial Security Force

- Flag of the Central Industrial Security Force
- Abbreviation: CISF
- Motto: "संरक्षण एवं सुरक्षा"; Protection and Security

Agency overview
- Formed: 10 March 1969; 57 years ago
- Employees: 190,000 active Personnel
- Annual budget: ₹16,828.85 crore (US$1.8 billion) (2026–27)

Jurisdictional structure
- Federal agency: India
- Operations jurisdiction: India
- Governing body: Ministry of Home Affairs
- Constituting instrument: Central Industrial Security Force Act, 1968
- General nature: Federal law enforcement

Operational structure
- Headquarters: New Delhi, India
- Minister responsible: Amit Shah, Minister of Home Affairs
- Agency executive: Praveer Ranjan, IPS, Director General

Notables
- Person: O. P. Singh (IPS), for Former Director General

Website
- cisf.gov.in

The Central Industrial Security Force (CISF) is a central armed police force in India, under the Ministry of Home Affairs, Government of India. CISF's primary mission is to provide security policing services to large institutions, whether state-owned or privately owned.

It was set up under an Act of the Parliament of India on 15 March 1969 with a strength of 2,800. CISF was subsequently formally authorized by another Act of Parliament passed on 15 June 1983. Its current active strength is 148,371 personnel. In April 2017, the government raised the sanctioned strength from 145,000 to 180,000 personnel. Recently the strength has been increased to 200,000.

Among its duties are guarding sensitive governmental buildings, Parliament complex, the Delhi Metro, and providing airport security.

CISF also provides consultancy services to private industries as well as other organisations within the Indian government. The scope of CISF's consulting practice includes security consulting and fire protection consulting.

It also plays a major role in Disaster Management. The CISF has a 'Fire Wing' which helps during fire accidents in Industries where the CISF is on guard.

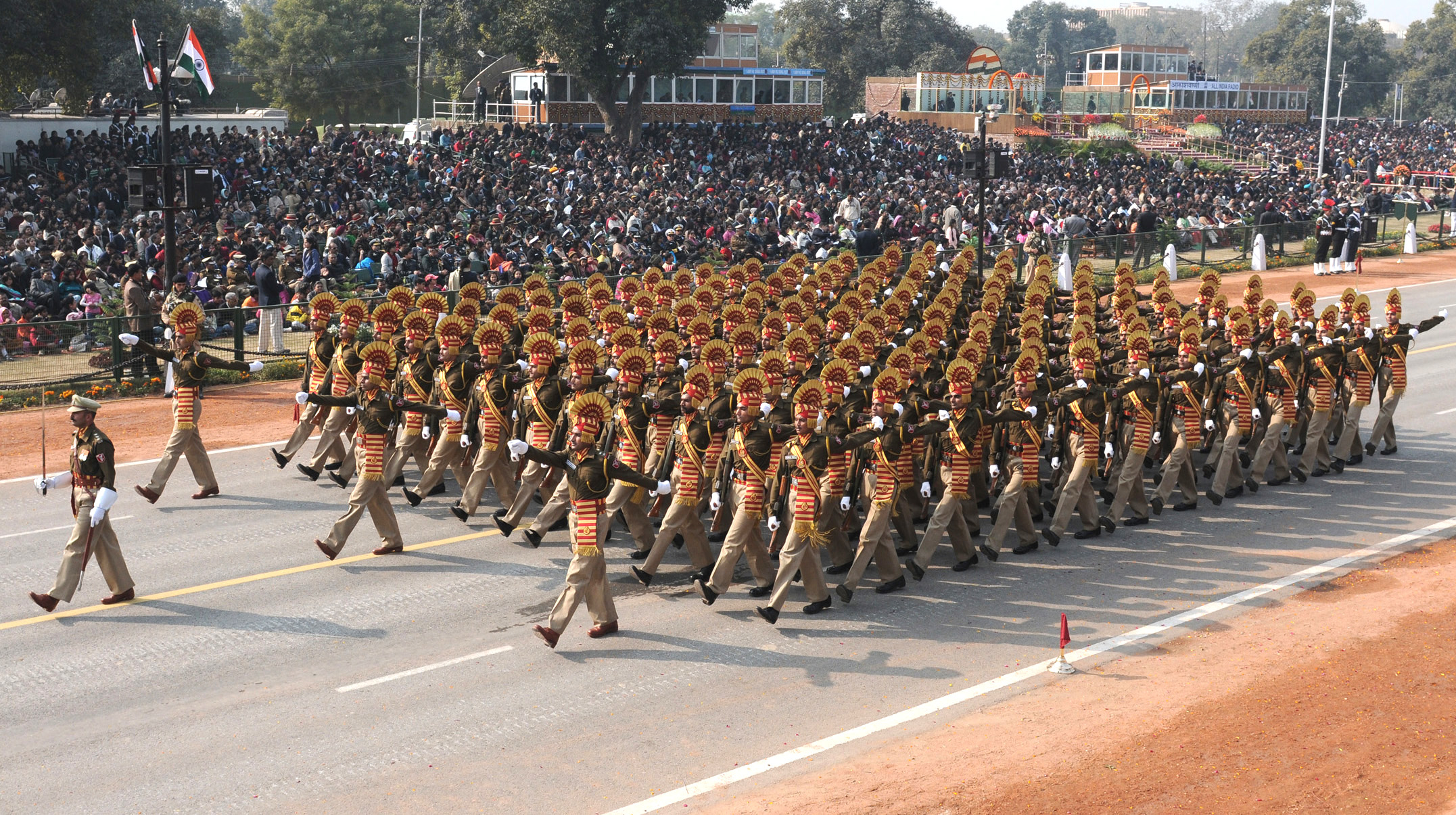
CISF marching contingent in New Delhi

== History ==
The Central Industrial Security Force (CISF) was established by an Act of Parliament on 10 March 1969 with an initial sanctioned strength of approximately 188,000 personnel.

As its name indicates, it was created to provide better protection and security to industrial undertakings across the country. Initially, protection was limited to industries wholly owned by the Central Government. This restriction has since been relaxed, and the CISF now also safeguards joint-venture enterprises in which the Central Government has a stake.

Over the years, the role of the CISF has significantly expanded and diversified. Today, in addition to industrial units, it provides security to airports, seaports, metro rail networks, key government buildings, heritage monuments (including the Taj Mahal and Red Fort), opium and alkaloid extraction units, nuclear power plants, and space establishments.The CISF also specialises in VIP security and disaster management. Currently, it performs a wide range of duties related to internal security, election security, anti-Naxal operations, and any other tasks assigned to it by the Government of India.

== Structure and organisation ==
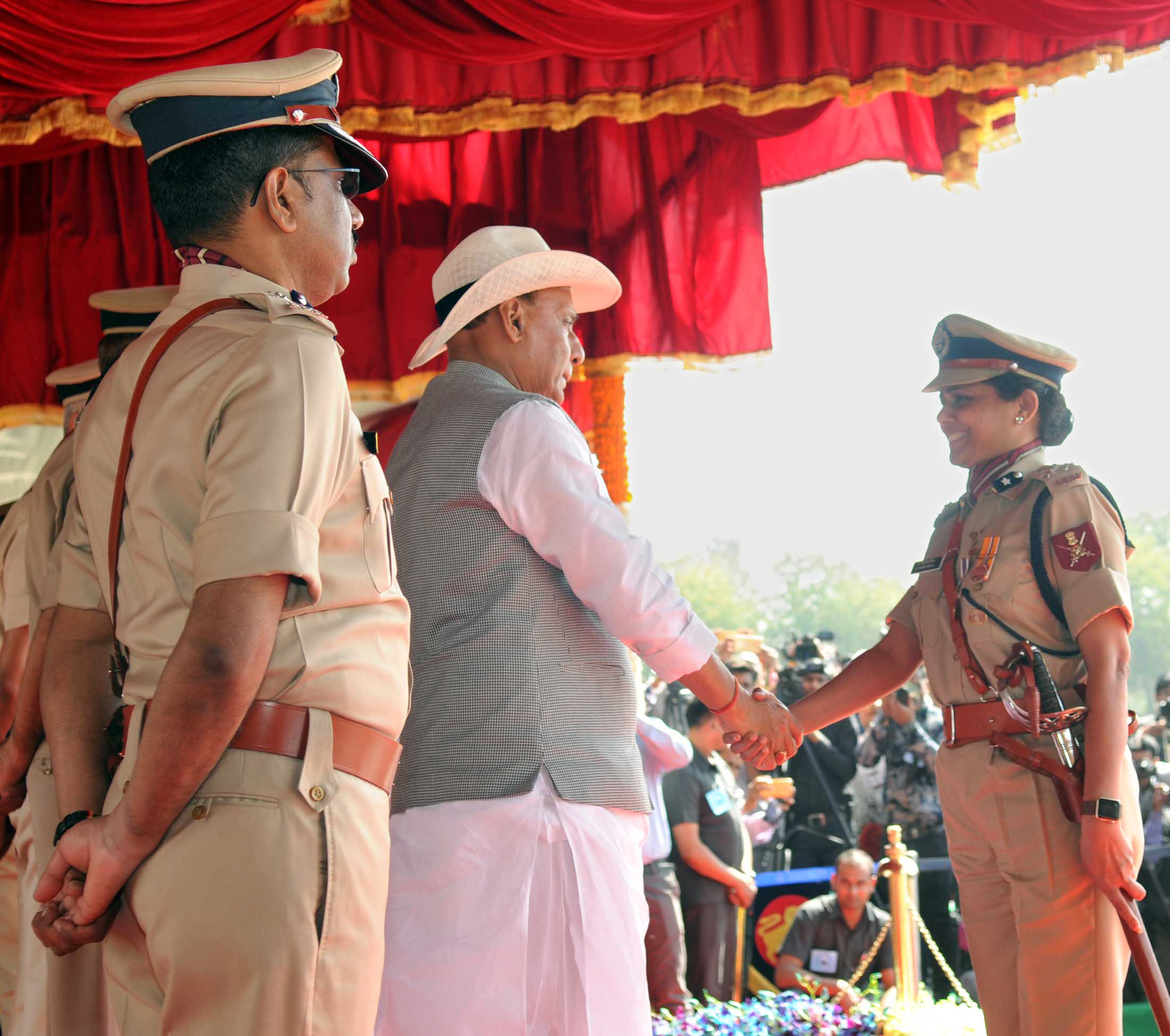
Union Home Minister, Rajnath Singh, presenting decorations to CISF personnel in Ghaziabad

The CISF is headed by an Indian Police Service officer with the rank of Director-General, assisted by an IPS officer in the rank of Addl. Director-General. The force is divided into Nine Sectors (Airport, North, North-East, East, West, South, Training, South-East, Central) and also has a Fire Service Wing.

The Airport Sector is commanded by an IPS officer in the rank of Addl. Director-General, assisted by an Inspector-General. The Airport Sector is divided into a number of Field Formation Units, one for each airport. Units at major international airports are commanded by a Deputy Inspector-General or Commandant; units at smaller airports by a Deputy or Assistant Commandant. The other six Sectors are each commanded by an Inspector-General, who is assisted by a Deputy Inspector-General.

The seven regional Sectors are divided into Zones, each commanded by a Deputy Inspector-General. Within each Zone are a number of Units, each under the command of a Commandant, or a DIG for certain major Units. A Deputy Commandant serves as the second-in-command of most units, or as the head of a smaller unit. Within the Training Sector, the National Industrial Security Academy (NISA) is headed by an Inspector-General; the Fire Service Training Institute (FSTI) and six other recruit training centres are headed by Deputy Inspectors General.

The Financial Adviser of the CISF has been an Indian Revenue Service officer of the rank of Director and also has Dy Advisers from the Indian Audit and Accounts Service and Indian Civil Account Service.

=== Rank structure ===
Being a central Indian police agency and having high presence of Indian Police Service officers, CISF follows ranks and insignia similar to other police organisations in India. Non-gazetted (enrolled) officers and members use the same ranks as other Indian police forces.

Officers

Rank group	General / flag officers			Senior officers			Junior officers
Central Industrial Security Force	Director-general - / Special director-general - / Additional director-general -
Central Industrial Security Force	Director-general - / Special director-general - / Additional director-general -	Inspector general -	Deputy inspector-general -	Senior commandant -	Commandant -	Deputy commandant -	Assistant commandant -

Enlisted ranks

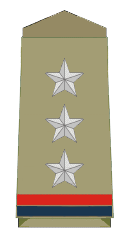
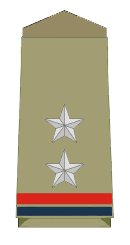
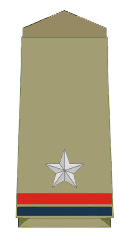
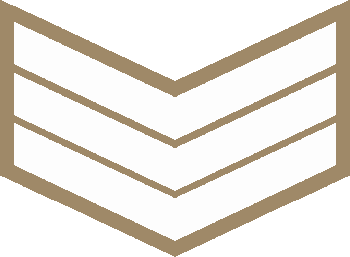
Rank group	Subordinate Officers (SO)			Non commissioned officers (NCO)	Enlisted
Central Industrial Security Force					No insignia
Central Industrial Security Force	Inspector निरीक्षक	Sub inspector उप निरीक्षक	Assistant sub-inspector सहायक उप निरीक्षक	Head constable हवलदार	Constable कनिष्ठबल

== CISF protection to Non-Nationalised Industry ==
The Indian Parliament on 25 February 2009, authorised the provision of Central Industrial Security Force security to private and cooperative establishments across the country for a fee with the passage of the CISF (Amendment) Bill, 2008.

The Bill, which was passed by Rajya Sabha on 19 February and Lok Sabha on 25 February 2009, also provides for deployment of CISF to protect Indian missions abroad and its participation in the UN peacekeeping operations.

CISF started providing security to the Infosys Bengaluru campus on 31 July 2009. The Infosys in Mysuru, the Reliance Jamnagar Refinery and the Delhi Metro Airport Express Line are in the list of private sector establishments placed under CISF cover. Manish Kumar Rai, Assistant Commandant, led the first contingent of CISF deployed at Infosys Bengaluru.

CISF has also started providing security to the Infosys Pune campus from 21 April 2011.

In 2016, the Patanjali Food and Herbal Park received 35 full-time, armed Central Industrial Security Force (CISF) commandos. The park was the eighth private institute in India to be guarded by paramilitary CISF forces.

== Major Subunits ==
=== Airport security ===
The Central Industrial Security Force (CISF) is responsible for security at all commercial airports in India, that is handled by specialized Airport Sector, which oversees aviation security operations across the country. Airport security was previously handled by state-controlled airport police. The idea of transferring this responsibility to the CISF was first raised after the 1999 hijacking of Indian Airlines Flight 814, though it remained dormant for two years.

In the wake of the 9/11 terrorist attacks in the United States, the Government of India moved to strengthen aviation security and formally adopted the proposal to deploy the CISF at airports. Jaipur Airport became the first to come under CISF control on 3 February 2000, and most other commercial airports soon followed.

As of February 2023, the CISF provides security at 66 international and domestic airports across the country.

=== CISF Unit Delhi Metro Rail Corporation ===
Security on the Delhi Metro is provided and handled by the CISF Unit Delhi Metro Rail Corporation, which assumed responsibility from the Delhi Police in 2007. It oversees an extensive surveillance system, with feeds reviewed in real time by both CISF and Metro control rooms. More than 3,500 CISF personnel are deployed across the network, supported by metal detectors, X-ray baggage scanners, and dog squads. Each train car is equipped with an intercom for emergency communication with the driver, and regular security drills are conducted to ensure operational preparedness.

=== Parliament Security ===
From 20 May 2024 onwards, the CISF has been entrusted with the responsibility of securing the entire Parliament House complex, including both the old and present Parliament buildings following the withdrawal of Parliamentary Duty Group (PDG) personnel of the CRPF and Delhi Police due to a recent security breach. To enhance the complex’s security architecture, the CISF has implemented an upgraded framework, that covers access control, perimeter & internal security, counter-terror preparedness, and emergency response.

Over 3,300 personnel are deployed with advanced screening systems and specialised training in Drone, Cyber, CBRN and NSG/Army modules.

=== Fire Wing ===
In addition to providing protection, safety, and security to industrial undertakings, the CISF also offers specialized protection against fire hazards. It is the only Central Armed Police Force with a full-fledged fire service wing, which is also the largest fire-fighting force in the country. The CISF’s first fire unit, comprising 53 personnel, was inducted at Fertilisers and Chemicals Travancore, Kochi, on 16 April 1970, following recommendations by a commission led by Justice B. Mukherjee that investigated a major fire at the Heavy Engineering Corporation plant in Ranchi on 29 January 1970.

In January 1991, the Government of India approved recruitment rules for various posts to establish a dedicated fire service cadre within the CISF, which formally began functioning on 12 January 1991. As of 31 March 2020, the fire wing has been inducted into 104 units and has a total strength of 8,482 personnel.

=== Seaport security ===
The Central Industrial Security Force (CISF) has been tasked to take over the security of all the ports in India. As of 2026, the CISF already provides the security of 12 major ports across India, and over 200 other non-major ports, 78 of which handle export-import operations, are protected by the respective State Police Forces. On 19 January, CISF Director General, Praveer Ranjan said that the responsibility of these additional 78 ports will be transferred to the force. The Union Home Minister, Amit Shah, also recently chaired a meeting to take up the case of vessels and port security.

The force will establish a dedicated "vertical for seaports" in line with the Airport Sector arrangement. A Bureau of Port Security (BoPS) will also be established as a statutory body on the lines of the Bureau of Civil Aviation Security (BCAS). The new units will require 12,000 personnel, and their recruitment and training for the specific requirements have been approved by the government. The force is now preparing an action plan. A dedicated training centre is being considered at a maritime institute at the Okha Port, Gujarat, where personnel will be trained before deployment. The operations will follow a hybrid model similar to the one adopted in airport security, where the operations are divided into core and non-core functions.

A committee headed by Additional Director General Sudhir Kumar has submitted a six-point set of recommendations to the government, which suggests the formation of the Recognised Security Organisation (RSO). The RSO will be tasked with the security assessment and planning of each port. These functions were earlier carried out by private agencies. The government has also accepted the recommendation to lay out different standards of security based on the category of port. The report also suggests the deployment of a drive-through container scanning system at these ports. Jab moments should be monitored by the Integrated Command and Control Centre (ICCC).

=== Special Security Group ===
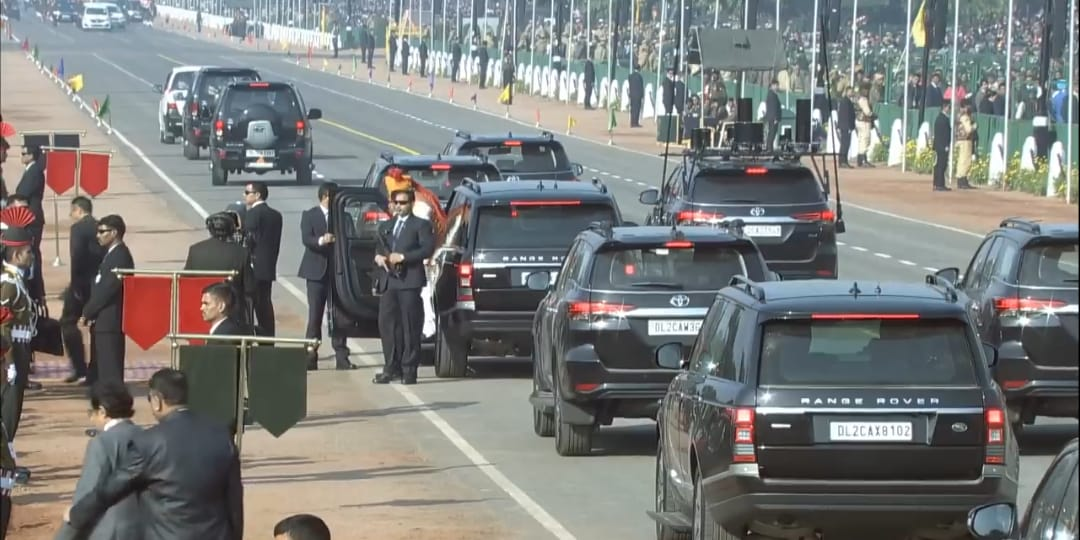
The Prime Minister's Security personnel, which includes SSG members.

In 2006, Central Industrial Security Force (CISF), on the basis of recommendations of the Intelligence Bureau, raised a special unit called Special Security Group (SSG) to provide security cover to people nominated by the Home Ministry. It came into existence on 17 November 2006. This unit is responsible for providing physical protection, evacuation, mobile and static security cover to persons who have been nominated by the Home Ministry. For a person to be eligible for security cover by CISF special unit, the intelligence bureau and other secret police agencies are required to specify the danger after a detailed 'threat analysis', which are often fudged for political and other considerations. In addition to CISF the Government also utilizes CRPF for personal security cover.

== Women in CISF ==
- Initially the recruitment and posting of Personnel to the CISF was restricted to men. In the year 1992, Mrs. Asha Sinha earned the distinction of being the First Woman Commandant of a Central Armed Police Forces in India when she was posted as Commandant, Mazagon Dock Shipbuilders Limited. Earlier the role of Women was allowed but limited to supervisory roles in the Central Armed Police Forces which includes the CISF. The Parliamentary Committees of India for women's empowerment recommended greater roles for women in the CAPF including CISF. On these recommendations the Ministry of Home Affairs (India) declared reservation for women in constabulary in paramilitary forces, and later declared that they can also be inducted as officers in combat roles in all five Central Armed Police Forces.
- The Union Home Minister announced that women's representation in the CRPF and CISF would be made 15 per cent. On 5 January 2016, it was decided that 33 per cent posts at the constabulary level would be reserved for women in the CRPF and the CISF in a phased manner. The CISF is increasing the engagement of women at positions where there is greater Civilian-Police Interaction, specially in the Airports and the Metro Stations.

== Overseas Deployment ==
A contingent of the CISF was deployed at United Nations Stabilizations Mission in Haiti (MINUSTAH) / United Nations Mission for Justice Support in Haiti (MINUJUSTH) since 17 August 2008. It was repatriated to India on 31 December 2018.

On 17 July 2024, the CISF deployed officers alongside the CRPF, SSB, ITBP, NSG and the Assam Rifles to provide security assistance to the Police Nationale and Gendarmerie Nationale for the 2024 Olympics in Paris.

== See also ==
- Infrastructure security
- Ministry of Home Affairs
- Border Security Force
- Indo-Tibetan Border Police
- Central Reserve Police Force
- Sashastra Seema Bal
- Security categories in India
- Assam Rifles
- National Security Guard
- Border outpost
- Security police
- CISF Protectors football team
