= Third Extraordinary Session of the Islamic Summit Conference =

Third Extraordinary Session of the Islamic Summit
- 7-8 December 2005
- Host country: Saudi Arabia
- Cities: Mecca

The Third Extraordinary Session of the Islamic Summit Conference was a conference organised by the Organisation of the Islamic Conference in Makkah, Saudi Arabia, on 7 and 8 December 2005.

The conference dealt with issues regarding the "crisis" in Islam, and outlined a 10-year modernisation program.
