= Ryan International Group of Institutions =

Group of private educational institutions in India

- Mumbai

Information
- School type: Private sector
- Established: 1976
- Founder: Dr. A.F. Pinto
- School board: CBSE, IB, CISCE, IGCSE, HSC, ICSE, SSC, GSEB
- Chairman: Dr. Augustine F. Pinto
- Director: Dr. Snehal Pinto and Ms. Sonal Pinto
- Campus Director: Dr Grace Pinto
- CEO: Ryan Pinto
- Grades: 7696964
- Language: English
- Website: www.ryaninternational.org

Ryan International Group of Institutions is a group of private educational institutions in India and other countries. The group started its first school in Kerala in 1976 and currently has more than 135 schools in India and other countries including significant locations in Maharashtra, Delhi-NCR, and Karnataka. The group collaborates with universities in the US to enhance education globally.

The group employs over 18,000 faculty members and over 30,000 students pass from Ryan schools annually. Students of Ryan International Schools are commonly known as "Ryanites."

== Origins ==
In the initial attempts to set up an English-medium school for the middle class in Mumbai, Dr. Pinto, the founder-promoter and chairman of RIGI, set up a small school in 1974 that failed to take off. However, he and Grace Albuquerque, a teacher at that time, eventually established St. Xavier's High School in Borivali East, a Mumbai suburb, with the help of Anthony Silva Pinto, the new head of OLPS School, Chembur.

== Ryan International School's list ==
=== Ryan International School, Malad ===
Ryan International School has two schools in Malad under CBSE and ICSE affiliations. The ICSE school in Malad was awarded the Quality School Governance Accreditation by the National Accreditation Board for Education and Training in 2014. Sonal Naik is the principal of the school.

=== Ryan International School, Greater Noida ===
Ryan International School Greater Noida was established in 2003 and had 3,200 students as of 2019.

=== Ryan International School, Sanpada ===
Ryan International School is a school in Sanpada which is affiliated with the CBSE. It was established in 2003 and has won over a thousand awards in India and abroad for excellence in education and social service. Muriel Fernandes is the principal of the school.

=== Ryan International School, Rohini Sector 11, H-3 ===
Ryan International School is a school in Rohini, Delhi which is affiliated with the CBSE. It was established in 2005 and is mostly known for Green World in India. Parul Narang is the principal of the school. The School Has Over 900+ Students.

=== Ryan International School, Sai Nagar ===
Ryan International School, Sai Nagar is a school in Jalna and is a part of Ryan International Group of Institutions. It is affiliated with the CBSE. It was established in year 2006. The Principal of the School is Ms. Poonam Shantaram Narwade as of 2025. This School is from one of the Top 10 Schools in Jalna District.

=== Ryan International School and st John's high school, Paithan Road ===
Ryan International School and st John's high school, Paithan Road is a school in Aurangabad and are a part of Ryan International Group of Institutions. It is affiliated with ICSE and ssc board maharashtra. It is a Co-ed School established in year 2006. The Principal of the School is Mrs. Vijayalaxmi Pillay as of 2025. This School is from one of the Top 10 Schools in Aurangabad District.

=== Ryan International School, Bannerghatta ===
Ryan international school, Bannerghatta Road is a school in Bengaluru and is a part of the Ryan International group. It is affiliated to ICSE New Delhi, It was inaugurated in 2007 by the then Governor of Karnataka. The Principal of the school is Mrs. Preeti Seth, The school ranks among top 20 schools in Bengaluru.

== Academics ==
In 2019, students of Ryan International Group secured top ranks at the district, school and national levels in both the ICSE and CBSE formats.

The schools in Pune, Sharjah, Sanpada, Mangaluru, Bengaluru, and Abu Dhabi have adopted the Tata ClassEdge technology.

== Awards and recognition ==
- The school received the Samson Daniel Award from HelpAge India in 2015.
- 2015 - 12 schools of Ryan International Group of Institutions were ranked among the best schools in the international, CBSE, and ICSE.
- 2015 - Madam Grace Pinto, managing director of the group, received The World's Greatest Leaders Award 2015 from the United Research Services Media Consulting PL and AsiaOne Magazine at the Indo-UAE Business Summit 2015, held in the United Arab Emirates.
- 2016 - Ryan Group's school in Sharjah, UAE was recognised by the Guinness World Records for participating in the world's largest charity donation for the poor.
- 2017 - Madam Grace Pinto was awarded the Lifetime Achievement in Education by MidDay.

== Management ==
- Dr Augustine Francis Pinto
- Dr Madame Grace Pinto, Managing Director.
- Mr. Ryan Pinto, CEO, Ryan Group

== Extracurricular activities ==
=== International Children's Festival of Performing Arts ===
The school holds a yearly International Children's Festival of Performing Arts. The 14th occurrence of this event was held in January 2016 in Mumbai with the theme 'Celebrating Diversity.' The event attracted over 40,000 students including notable individuals from India and 17 different countries.

== Controversies ==
=== Tax evasion ===
The school has been accused of tax evasion by means of 'trusts' that students' parents have been asked to pay on various occasions. In February 2007, parents filed a complaint against RIS, Ludhiana for fraudulently collecting around Rs 4 crore from them by way of donations (over and above roughly Rs 10 crore for tuition and admission fees).

The founders have been accused of money laundering by investing in a dubious finance company and manipulating its share price illegally.

=== Pradyuman Thakur murder case ===
On 8 September 2017, Pradyuman Thakur, a student at the Ryan International School in Gurugram, was murdered. The killing was planned by a class 11 student in order to postpone exams and parent-teacher meetings. Other students of the same school and their parents told that violence and bullying are common at the school and that school authorities act to hide the incidents rather than take steps to control them. After this murder case the principal, Neerja Batra, was suspended and there was a case filed against Ryan Group and Pinto family.

== Alumni ==
- Saloni Daini
- Ashnoor Kaur
- Roshni Walia
- Navika Kotia
- Vivek Kumar
- Sanya Malhotra
- Roopam Sharma
- Chirag Shetty
- Digangana Suryavanshi
- Karman Thandi
- Arjun Vajpai
- Rahul Bheke
- Anushka Sen
- Aakanksha Singh
- Dhvani Bhanushali
- Nitanshi Goel
- Akshat Singh
- Bhavya Gandhi
- Avinash Mukherjee
