= OIC Computer Emergency Response Team =

Affiliated organ of the Organisation of Islamic Cooperation

- Arabic: فريق منظمة التعاون الإسلامي للاستجابة لحالات الطوارئ الحاسوبية; French: Équipe d'intervention d'urgence informatique de l'OCI
- Official patch of the OIC-CERT
- Abbreviation: OIC-CERT
- Formation: 2009; 17 years ago
- Founded at: Damascus, Syria
- Type: Computer emergency response team
- Legal status: Foundation
- Purpose: Computer security
- Headquarters: CyberSecurity Malaysia, Jalan Tasik, Mines Wellness City
- Location: Selangor, Malaysia
- Methods: Communication protocol, Internet protocol suite, Synchronization
- Fields: Digital electronics
- Members: 27 member states
- Official language: Arabic, English, French
- Owner: Organisation of Islamic Cooperation
- Main organ: Organisation of Islamic Cooperation
- Website: oic-cert.org/en

The OIC Computer Emergency Response Team (Arabic: فريق منظمة التعاون الإسلامي للاستجابة لحالات الطوارئ الحاسوبية; French: Équipe d'intervention d'urgence informatique de l'OCI), commonly known as OIC-CERT, is a computer emergency response team and one of the 17 affiliated organs of the Organisation of Islamic Cooperation. Focused on global cybersecurity in the 27 member and non-member states, it is considered the world's third-largest computer emergency response team coordinated by the 27 countries. The OIC-CERT is primarily focused on providing emergency support in cyber resilience with global collaboration with its associated members and information security organizations. It also encourages member states to implement cybersecurity policies by their respective CERTs.

Chaired by CyberSecurity Malaysia, a national cybersecurity agency, it also serves as the Secretariat of OIC-CERT. Huawei became the first multinational technology corporation to sign the OIC-CERT membership in 2021. Its membership is sponsored by the UAE Computer Emergency Response Team (aeCERT). OIC-CERT maintains a global information and communications technology ecosystem and assisted nations in preventing cyberattack challenges.

== History ==
OIC Computer Emergency Response Team was established by adopting a resolution INF-36/2 in May 2009 by the OIC Council of Foreign Ministers in its 36th session held in Damascus, Syria. The council of foreign affairs granted OIC-CERT the status of an affiliated institution in the same year.

=== Code of Ethics ===
Code of Ethics are the fundamental elements of the organisation that determine the status, cybercrime behaviour and membership by its Steering Committee. It regulates the information security organizations and the member states under four Codes of Ethics.

== Objectives ==
Established for global cooperation between the cybersecurity organisation within the framework of the Charter of the Organisation of Islamic Cooperation, its main activities are focused on promoting and building the relationship between the member states in cybersecurity sector, in addition to exchanging information and minimising cyberterrorism, and cybercrime. It also conducts educational and internet security awareness programmes in cybersecurity sector and provides cooperation technology research and development.

The OIC-CERT objectively works on two principles such as capacity building and infrastructure programmes which are financially aided by the member states and the Islamic Development Bank. The financial assistance model is jointly managed by the Organization of American States and the Asia Pacific Team.

The OIC-CERT conduct International Cyber Drills every year since 2009 to enhance and develop Cyber Security Capabilities of member states.

The OIC-CERT also regulates the 5G Security Working Group (WG) that maintains 5G technology within the scope of the OIC Charter. The WG also conducts competition programmes concerning 5G.

== Members ==
#	Country	Agencies	Membership status
1	Azerbaijan	Azerbaijan Government CERT	Full, Board member
2	Bangladesh	Bangladesh e-Government Computer Incident Response Team: Bangladesh Computer Council; Bangladesh Computer Emergency Response Team (BDCERT)	Full, General member
3	Brunei	Brunei Computer Emergency Response Team (BRUCERT)	Full
4	Ivory Coast	Ivory Coast Computer Emergency Response Team (CI-CERT)	Full
5	Egypt	Egyptian Computer Emergency Readiness Team (EG-CERT)	Full, Board member
6	Indonesia	National Cyber and Crypto Agency (NCCA), (BSSN)	Full, Board member
7	Iran	Iran Telecommunication Research Center (ITRC): IrCERT (APA)	Full, General member, Board member
8	Jordan	Jordan Computer Emergency Response Team (JO-CERT)	Full
9	Kazakhstan	Kazakhstan Computer Emergency Response Team (KZ-CERT): Center for Analysis and Investigation of Cyber-Attacks (CAICA)	Full, General member
10	Korea	DUZON	
11	Kuwait	Kuwait National Cyber Security Center (NCSC-KW)	Full
12	Kyrgyzstan	Computer Emergency Response Team of Kyrgyz Republic (CERT-KG)	Full, General member
13	Libya	Libya Computer Emergency Response Team (Libya-CERT)	Full
14	Malaysia	CyberSecurity Malaysia: Universiti Teknikal Malaysia Melaka (UTeM)	Full, General member, Board member
15	Morocco	Moroccan National Computer Emergency Response Team (maCERT)	Full
16	Nigeria	Consultancy Support Service (CS2) Limited	Full
17	Oman	Oman National CERT (OCERT)	Full, Board member
18	Pakistan	Pakistan Information Security Association (PISA-CERT)	General member
19	Pakistan	National Response Center for Cyber Crime (NR3C-CERT)	Full
20	Qatar	Qatar Computer Emergency Response Team (Q-CERT)	Full
21	Saudi Arabia	Saudi Computer Emergency Response Team (CERT-SA)	Full
22	Sudan	Sudan Computer Emergency Response Team (sudanCERT)	Full
23	Syria	Information Security Center (ISC)	Full
24	Tunisia	National Agency for Computer Security	Full
25	Turkey	National Cyber Security Incident Response Team (TR-CERT)	Full, General member
26	United Arab Emirates	UAE Computer Emergency Response Team (aeCERT)	Full, Board member
27	Uzbekistan	Uzbekistan Computer Emergency Response Team (UzCERT)	Full, General member
28	Uganda	Uganda Computer Emergency Response Team (UG-CERT)	General member
