= Internet in the Czech Republic =

Internet in the Czech Republic and Internet access are largely provided by the private sector and is available in a variety of forms, using a variety of technologies, at a wide range of speeds and costs. In 2013, 68% of Czechs were connected to the Internet. From 2013 to 2022, the number of Internet users in the Czech Republic increased rapidly to 91.48%.

== Status ==
- Internet users: 7.6 million, 45th in the world; 75.0% of the population, 37th in the world (2012).
- Fixed broadband: 1.7 million subscriptions, 46th in the world; 16.6% of the population, 56th in the world (2012).
- Mobile broadband: 4.5 million subscriptions, 41st in the world; 44.0% of the population, 36th in the world (2012).
- Hosts: 4.1 million, 27th in the world (2012).
- IPv4: 8.0 million addresses allocated, 0.2% of world total, 790 per 1000 persons (2012).
- Top level domain: .cz

== Wireless ==
=== Wi-Fi ===
Because ADSL was very expensive for an average worker in its early days, an enormous number of wireless ISPs (WISPs) (based on 802.11 Wi-Fi technology) came into existence offering reasonably priced monthly-plans since 2003. At the beginning of 2008, there were over 800 mostly local WISPs that had enormous market share of the Internet access. It is estimated Wi-Fi ISPs have about 350 000 subscribers by 2007. The Czech Republic has the most Wi-Fi subscriber in the whole European Union. There are both commercial and community wireless networks.

=== Mobile ===
Mobile data plans are being offered by all three mobile phone operators (T-Mobile, Vodafone and O2. They all offer connection using LTE, GPRS and EDGE technology. 5G networks are being switched on in some locations (for example in the Prague Metro).

On 31 March 2021, Vodafone switched off their 3G (UMTS) network. T-Mobile is planning to switch their 3G network off at the end of November 2021. O2 announced a shutdown of their 3G network running from 31 May to 30 November 2021.

CDMA2000 networks have been switched off already.

Comparison of mobile data plans (data-only plans without voice)

Company	Plan name	Technology	Maximum download speed/(kbit/s)	Maximum upload speed/(kbit/s)	Data limit/GB	Monthly price incl. VAT/CZK	Source
O2	Data+ Modrý 2 GB	4G LTE	?	?	2/month	199	
O2	Data+ Bronzový 10 GB	4G LTE	?	?	10/month	399	
O2	Data+ Stříbrný 30 GB	4G LTE	?	?	30/month	649	
Vodafone	Red Data+ 10 GB	4G LTE	?	?	10/month	399	
Nordic Telecom	LTE mobilní data 4 GB	4G LTE	5000	5000	4/month	295	
Nordic Telecom	LTE mobilní data 8 GB	4G LTE	5000	5000	8/month	395	

== Fixed-wired ==
=== ADSL/VDSL ===
In the Czech Republic, ADSL became commercially available at the beginning of 2003, by then-monopoly operator Český Telecom with basic speeds from 192/64 kbit/s to 1024/256 kbit/s. The start-up of ADSL was very slow due to overpriced plans (~€350 per month for 1024/256 kbit). At the beginning of 2004, local loop unbundling began, and alternative operators started to offer ADSL (and also SDSL). This, and later privatisation of Český Telecom, helped to drive down prices. On 1 July 2006, Český Telecom was renamed to Telefónica O2 Czech Republic. As of 2009, ADSL2+ was offered in three variants, mostly without data limits (Fair User Policy - limiting link speed based on amount of transferred data). The speed varied depending on the loop length up to 20 Mbit/s.

In 2015, O2 Czech Republic (owned by PPF) was split into two companies: CETIN, which owns the fixed and mobile network, and the mobile operator, O2. CETIN is offering its cable network not only to O2, but also to another ISPs. Maximum speeds vary per each ISP (250 Mbit/s, 1 Gbit/s, etc.).

CETIN has been building remote DSLAMs around the Czech Republic. They are supposed to be installed instead of existing network nodes connected through a copper cable. Remote DSLAMs are connected to a fibre network, so old copper lines (from DSLAM to customer) can transmit higher speeds.

The typical ADSL/VDSL (no limits/no data cap) connection offered is from 20/2 Mbit up to 100/10Mbit. For short local loops, 250/25 Mbit/s plan is offered by some VDSL3 (G.Fast) internet providers.

=== Cable ===
Cable internet offers higher download speeds up to 1000 Mbit/s. The biggest ISP, UPC (which has been acquired by Vodafone in 2019 - Vodafone and UPC then merged) is providing its service mainly in big cities and attractive locations.

== Internet censorship and surveillance ==
There were no government restrictions on access to the Internet or credible reports the government monitors e-mail or Internet chat rooms without judicial oversight. Individuals and groups engage in the free expression of views via the Internet, including by e-mail.

The law provides for freedom of speech and press, and the government generally respects these rights. An independent press, an effective judiciary, and a functioning democratic political system combine to ensure freedom of speech and of the press. However, the law provides for some exceptions to these freedoms, for example, in cases of "hate speech", Holocaust denial, and denial of Communist-era crimes. The law prohibits arbitrary interference with privacy, family, home, or correspondence, and the government generally respects these prohibitions in practice.

Since 2008, mobile operators T-Mobile and Vodafone pass mobile and fixed Internet traffic through Cleanfeed, which uses data provided by the Internet Watch Foundation to identify pages believed to contain indecent photographs of children, and racist materials.

On 13 August 2009, Telefónica O2 Czech Republic, Czech DSL incumbent and mobile operator, started to block access to sites listed by the Internet Watch Foundation. The company said it wanted to replace the list with data provided by Czech Police. The rollout of the blocking system attracted public attention due to serious network service difficulties and many innocent sites mistakenly blocked. The specific blocking implementation is unknown but it is believed that recursive DNS servers provided by the operator to its customers have been modified to return fake answers diverting consequent TCP connections to an HTTP firewall.

On 6 May 2010, T-Mobile Czech Republic officially announced that it was starting to block web pages promoting child pornography, child prostitution, child trafficking, pedophilia and illegal sexual contact with children. T-Mobile claimed that its blocking was based on URLs from the Internet Watch Foundation list and on individual direct requests made by customers.

Since 1 January 2017, internet service providers are obligated to prevent from accessing "internet sites" listed on non-permitted internet games list. The list is maintained by Ministry of Finance of the Czech Republic. The motivation is to make obstacle in reaching unregulated and untaxed foreign internet lotteries by Czech citizens and to protect lottery companies that obeyed the Czech regulations.

On 25 February 2022, as a result of the 2022 Russian invasion of Ukraine and a call from the government, CZ.NIC decided to suspend 8 domains of conspiracy and fake news websites spreading Russian propaganda. On the same day, the cybernetic unit of the Czech military Intelligence has asked internet service providers to block access to 22 websites (including 8 domains above), while the blocking is voluntary. The suspension period took 3 months and was not extended.

== See also ==
- .cz, Czech top-level domain.
- CZ.NIC, Czech Network Information Center (domain operator).
- CSIRT.CZ, Cyber Security Response Team operated by CZ.NIC.
- Neutral Internet Exchange of the Czech Republic (NIX.CZ)
