= Brunei Computer Emergency Response Team =

Brunei government agency responsible for computer security incidents

- Pasukan Respons Kecemasan Komputer Brunei
- Abbreviation: BruCERT
- Formation: 1 May 2004; 22 years ago
- Founded at: Brunei
- Type: IT security
- Legal status: active
- Purpose: prevention and detection of cybersecurity and cybersecurity awareness
- Headquarters: Simpang 69, Jalan E-Kerajaan, Gadong
- Location: Bandar Seri Begawan, Brunei
- Fields: Cybersecurity, internet, Cyberattack
- Official language: Malay, English
- Parent organization: Department of Information and Communication Technology
- Affiliations: OIC Computer Emergency Response Team, Forum of Incident Response and Security Teams (FIRST), Asia Pacific CERT (APCERT)
- Website: www.brucert.org.bn

Brunei Computer Emergency Response Team (Malay: Pasukan Respons Kecemasan Komputer Brunei), commonly known as BruCERT, is a computer emergency response team and national cybersecurity organization of Brunei Darussalam. Affiliated with the OIC Computer Emergency Response Team, the Asia Pacific CERT (APCERT), Forum of Incident Response and Security Teams (FIRST) and other international organizations in the information technology sector, it is tasked with preventing, analysing, and maintaining cybersecurity in addition to serving as a national research centre for IT infrastructure in the country.

It has maintained a network for coordination with global organizations to identify cybercrime in the country with prime focus on computer and internet-related incidents within the jurisdiction of Brunei. BruCERT acquires data on information technology and security threats and shares acquired findings or detected risks. It makes these findings accessible to the general public for increasing cybersecurity awareness in the country.

== History ==
BruCERT was established on 1 May 2004 by the government of Brunei and tasked with improving security in coordination with the Department of Information and Communication Technology (ICT). BruCERT is entrusted with dealing with cyberterrorism and security incidents.

Brunei Computer Emergency Response Team is headquartered in Simpang 69, Jalan E-Kerajaan, Gadong, Brunei. Its host organization is the Information Technology Protective Security Services.
