= USOM =

USOM may refer to:

- Ulusal Siber Olaylara Müdahale Merkezi, Turkish name for TR-CERT, the Computer Emergency Response Team of the Republic of Turkey, established in 2013
- United States Operations Missions (sometimes reported as United States Overseas Mission), a predecessor of the United States Agency for International Development from 1953 to 1961
- Union Sportive Ouest Mitidja, former team of the League Algiers Football Association
