= Bangladesh e-Government Computer Incident Response Team =

National cybersecurity agency of Bangladesh

- Bengali: বাংলাদেশ ই-গভর্নমেন্ট কম্পিউটার ইনসিডেন্ট রেসপন্স টিম
- Seal of BGD e-Gov CIRT
- Abbreviation: BGD e-Gov CIRT
- Formation: 2016; 10 years ago
- Founder: Government of People's Republic of Bangladesh
- Founded at: Bangladesh
- Type: Computer emergency response team
- Legal status: Active
- Purpose: cybersecurity, response to cybersecurity incidents, internet security awareness, capacity building
- Fields: Cybersecurity
- Official language: Bangla, English
- Project director: Mohammad Saiful Alam Khan
- Main organ: Bangladesh Computer Council
- Affiliations: Ministry of Posts, Telecommunications and Information Technology
- Website: cirt.gov.bd

The Bangladesh e-Government Computer Incident Response Team (BGD e-Gov CIRT; Bengali: বাংলাদেশ ই-গভর্নমেন্ট কম্পিউটার ইনসিডেন্ট রেসপন্স টিম) is the state-run agency of the government of Bangladesh responsible for maintaining cybersecurity in the country. Works under the Ministry of Posts, Telecommunications and Information Technology, it is the national computer emergency response team (CERT) with prim focus on receiving and reviewing, and responding to cybersecurity incidents in the country.

BGD e-Gov CIRT conduct research in the field of cybersecurity and issues advisory on security-oriented vulnerabilities in coordination with various government and non-government organizations, including critical infrastructures, financial organizations, law enforcement agencies, academia and civil society. It works within its framework for providing assistance for the improvement of national defense system of Bangladesh. It has maintained a network with foreign organizations and communities for transborder cybersecurity-related matters.

== Service components ==
BGD e-Gov CIRT has 8 active service components designed for various cybersecurity matters, including computer systems, networks, capacity building and internet security awareness among others.

- Incident Handling Unit
- Digital Forensic Unit
- Cyber Awareness and Capacity Building Unit
- Cyber Sensor Unit
- Cyber Range Unit
- Cyber Risk Assessment Unit
- Critical Information Infrastructure Unit
- Cyber Audit Unit

== History ==
It was originally introduced by the Bangladesh Computer Council (BCC) in 2015 under the supervision of the now defunct LICT Project. BGD e-GOV CIRT became operational in February 2016 and was formally established by the federal government after the Bangladesh Bank robbery incident took place.

It also signed a memorandum of understanding (MoU) with the government of India's Ministry of Electronics and Information Technology on 8 April 2017 and remained the member of the Indian Computer Emergency Response Team until 7 April 2022. It is also a permanent member of the OIC Computer Emergency Response Team. In September 2018 BGD e-Gov CIRT became a trusted introducer incorporated by the European Computer Incident Response Team.
