= NBU =

NBU may refer to:

Universities

- North Bengal University, West Bengal, India
- New Bulgarian University, Sofia, Bulgaria
- Ningbo University, Zhejiang province, China
- Nippon Bunri University, Ōita, Japan
- Northern Borders University, Saudi Arabia

Other

- National Bee Unit, a bee research institute in the UK
- National Bank of Ukraine, the central bank of Ukraine
- NetBackup, an enterprise level backup and recovery suite
- National Bank of Uzbekistan, an alternative name for the National Bank for Foreign Economic Activity of the Republic of Uzbekistan
- .nbu (Nokia Backup), a file extension for Nokia mobile phone software
- Národný bezpečnostný úrad, Slovakia's national security authority
- Národní bezpečnostní úřad, Czechia's national security authority
- New British Union, a minor fascist party headed by Gary Raikes
- New Buffalo station, Amtrak station in Michigan
- New Braunfels Utilities, a utility contractor in the Texas city of New Braunfels.
