= Azerbaijan Government CERT =

- Azərbaycan Hökuməti CERT
- Abbreviation: AZ-CERT
- Nickname: Azerbaijan Computer Emergency Response Team
- Formation: 20 April 2008; 18 years ago
- Type: Computer Emergency Response Team
- Legal status: active
- Purpose: cybersecurity
- Headquarters: Special Communication & Information Security State Service of Azerbaijan
- Location: Baku, Azerbaijan
- Fields: Information technology
- Affiliations: OIC Computer Emergency Response Team
- Website: cert.gov.az/en

Azerbaijan Computer Emergency Response Team, officially known as Azerbaijan Government CERT (Azerbaijani: Azərbaycan Hökuməti CERT), is a computer emergency response team of the Republic of Azerbaijan responsible for cybersecurity and gathering data concerning information technology. It operates under the Special Communication and Information Security State Service of the government of Azerbaijan. It collects data within its framework from relevant sources, including internet users, computer engineering groups, individuals or organizations and software developers. It coordinates with the foreign countries for gathering and analysing data from cybersecurity incidents involving both software and hardware tools designed for the prevention of internet and computer security.

Azerbaijan CERT develop a framework for suggesting recommendations for software designed to maintain software and hardware tools entrusted with preventing unauthorised access to devices consisting personally identifiable information of the users. It operates within the scope of generalization and issues advisory in addition to providing technical support to users in the country. It also prevents cyberterrorism by spreading cybersecurity awareness. As national computer security agency, it provides assistance to the state governments concerning investigation of the computer incidents.

== Duties and responsibilities ==
Headquartered in Special Communication & Information Security State Service of Azerbaijan, Baku, Azerbaijan, Azerbaijan Computer Emergency Response Team is entrusted with issuing advisory on specific software and hardware tools in collaboration with public and private vendors. It also coordinates with foreign CERTs in information technology sector, including cybercrimes. It also conducts research in collaboration with state authorities for obtaining data on cybersecurity incidents and assists them in preventing cyberattacks and malicious softwares and disruption of IT network systems. The agency is also tasked with preventing denial-of-service attack within the jurisdiction of Azerbaijan.
