= CSIRT.CZ =

National CSIRT (Cyber Security Response Team) team

CSIRT.CZ is a national CSIRT (Cyber Security Response Team) team operated by CZ.NIC (operator of the .CZ top-level domain). CSIRT.CZ's main task is to handle security incidents in computer networks operated in the Czech Republic.

== Overview ==
The .CZ domain registry took over the agenda of the national security team from the academic association CESNET, which had operated a security team as part of a research grant since 2008. The memorandum with the Ministry of Interior on the operation of a National CSIRT was replaced on 1 October 2012 and a new provision was made with the National Security Authority of the Czech Republic. CSIRT.CZ now fulfills the role of National CERT on the basis of a public contract with the Czech National Security Agency.

The organization handles incident resolution, provides education on cybersecurity and co-operates with various stakeholders in the Czech Republic such as ISPs and banks.

== International cooperation ==
Since security incidents often go beyond national borders, international cooperation while solving security incidents and threats can be important. CSIRT.CZ collaborates with other CSIRT/CERT teams in different territories. The security team participates in the preparation and implementation of solutions and recommendations on appropriate approaches in the event of potential threats to cyberspace on both a European and global level. CSIRT.CZ holds the status of an accredited team in Trusted Introducer and is member of FIRST.
