= National Cyber Security Centre (Netherlands) =

Dutch government agency

- Nationaal Cyber Security Centrum
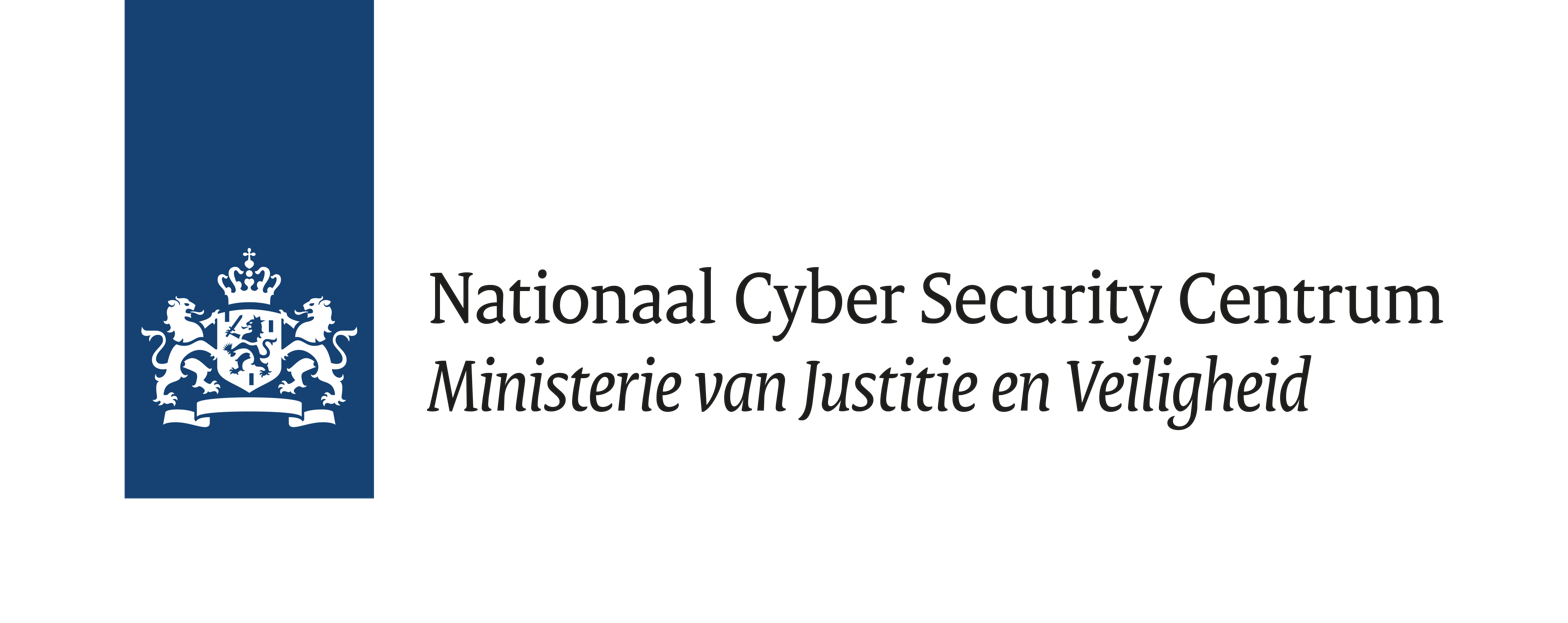

Agency overview
- Formed: 2012 (As part of the NCTV)
- Preceding agencies: CSIRT-DSP; Digital Trust Center
- Jurisdiction: Government of the Netherlands
- Headquarters: Turfmarkt 147, The Hague
- Motto: Veilig vooruit in een digitaal weerbaar Nederland (Moving forward safely in a digitally resilient Netherlands)
- Employees: 500+
- Annual budget: 39,037 Eu (2024)
- Minister responsible: David van Weel, Minister of Justice and Security
- Agency executive: Matthijs van Amelsfort, Director
- Parent department: Ministry of Justice and Security
- Website: ncsc.nl

The National Cyber Security Centre (NCSC), sometimes written as NCSC-NL, is the national computer emergency response team (CERT) and central expertise centre for information security of the Netherlands. As a Dutch government agency, it is part of the Ministry of Justice and Security, where it supports and advises the public and private sector on digital threats and vulnerabilities. It became operational in 2012, and became an independent agency in 2019.

== History ==
Overview of Information security organisations of the Government of the Netherlands

In 2012, GOVCERT.NL (Government Computer Emergency Response Team Netherlands) was merged into the office of the National Coordinator for Security and Counterterrorism (NCTV). GOVCERT.NL merged with the other cybersecurity teams of the NCTV to form the National Cyber Security Centre (NCSC), which operated as part of the NCTV until 2019, when it became an independent agency under the Ministry of Justice and Security.

In 2024, it was announced that the CSIRT-DSP (Computer Security Incident Response Team - Digital Service Providers) and the Digital Trust Center (DTC) would be merged into a restructured NCSC. The CSIRT-DSP merged in 2025, and the DTC merged in 2026. The NCSC restructured to fully absorb the merged agencies.

== Organisation ==
The National Cyber Security Centre operates three units that function under a central staff unit and advisory board:

The Operations unit manages incident response, crisis preparation, Cyber threat intelligence, technical investigation, and the fusion centre.

The cooperation and knowledge exchange unit manages relations, target audience communication, cooperation and cybersecurity advice, knowledge development, and scientific research and knowledge dispersal.

The Information provision and technical unit manages information management, data management, service development and management, and Information provision project management.

== Activities ==
The NCSC carries out their responsibilities by looking ahead to anticipate threats, and finding ways to prevent them. The NCSC also connects organizations with complex threat intelligence by translating it into implementable tips, and by learning from past incidents and sharing new information with partners.

The NCSC had four roles that they fulfill: a knowledge and advice center that translates cyber threats into practical tools, an implementation coordinator for security defenses, a national CSIRT for warning and first response to incidents, and a sectoral CSIRT that supports specific vital industries.

Additionally, the NCSC serves as the central contact and reporting point for cyber security incidents, and performs various security tasks mandated by law.

== See also ==
- National Coordinator for Security and Counterterrorism
- General Intelligence and Security Service
