= Computer emergency response team =

Organization which responds to computer security incidents

A computer emergency response team (CERT) is an incident response team dedicated to computer security incidents.

Other names used to describe CERT include cyber emergency response team, computer emergency readiness team, computer security incident response team (CSIRT), or cyber security incident response team.

== History ==
The name "Computer Emergency Response Team" was first used in 1988 by the CERT Coordination Center (CERT-CC) at Carnegie Mellon University (CMU). The term CERT is registered as a trade and service mark by CMU in multiple countries worldwide. CMU encourages the use of Computer Security Incident Response Team (CSIRT) as a generic term for the handling of computer security incidents. CMU licenses the CERT mark to various organizations that are performing the activities of a CSIRT.

The histories of CERT and CSIRT, are linked to the existence of malware, especially computer worms and viruses. Whenever a new technology arrives, its misuse is not long in following. The first worm in the IBM VNET was covered up. Shortly after, a worm hit the Internet on 3 November 1988, when the so-called Morris Worm paralysed a good percentage of it. This led to the formation of the first computer emergency response team at Carnegie Mellon University under a U.S. Government contract. With the massive growth in the use of information and communications technologies over the subsequent years, the generic term 'CSIRT' refers to an essential part of most large organisations' structures. In many organisations the CSIRT evolves into an information security operations center.

== Organizations ==
=== Worldwide ===
Logo	Organization	Description	Size	Member of FIRST
	FIRST	The Forum of Incident Response and Security Teams is the global association of CSIRTs.	More than 820 member teams in over 110 countries (December 2025).	n/a
	Packet Clearing House	"CERT of last resort" with global coverage, serving countries and constituencies which are not yet served by their own dedicated CERT. Founded in 1994.	18 staff, presence in 106 countries, budget US$251m/yr.	Yes
	TF-CSIRT	European task force of CSIRTs, whose Trusted Introducer service maintains a directory of security teams and operates a three-level scheme of listing, accreditation and certification (based on the SIM3 maturity model).	Over 550 teams listed in the Trusted Introducer directory.	n/a

=== Local ===
Country	Team/s	Description	Employees	Member of FIRST?
Algeria	CERIST	The Research Centre on Scientific and Technical Information in Algeria, CERIST.		
Armenia	AM-CERT	National CERT (Computer Emergency Response Team) or CSIRT (Computer Security Incident Response Team) of Armenia.		Yes
Australia	AusCERT	Cyber Emergency Response Team (CERT) in Australia and the Asia/Pacific region		Yes
Australia	Australian Cyber Security Centre (ACSC)	In 2010 the Australian Federal Government started CERT Australia. In 2018 CERT Australia became part of the Australian Cyber Security Centre (ACSC) which then in turn became part of the Australian Signals Directorate (ASD).		Yes
Austria	CERT.at	The national Computer Emergency Response Team for Austria as part of the Austrian domain registry NIC.at for .at.	9	Yes
Austria	govCERT Austria	A public-private partnership of CERT.at and the Austrian Chancellery.		Yes
Austria	Austrian Energy CERT (AEC)	A cooperation between CERT.at and the Austrian energy sector for energy and gas sector.		Yes
Austria	ACOnet-CERT	The Computer Emergency Response Team of ACOnet.		Yes
Azerbaijan	CERT.gov.az	Azerbaijan Government Computer Emergency Response Team.		Yes
Bangladesh	BGD e-Gov CIRT	Bangladesh Government's Computer Incident Response Team (BGD e-GOV CIRT) is acting as the National CIRT of Bangladesh (N-CIRT) currently with responsibilities including receiving, reviewing, and responding to computer security incidents and activities.		Yes
Belgium	CERT.be	Centre for Cyber Security Belgium		Yes
Bolivia	CGII.gob.bo	Centro de Gestión de Incidentes Informáticos	8	
Brazil	CERT.br	Brazilian National Computer Emergency Response Team		Yes
Canada	Canadian Centre for Cyber Security	Assumed national CERT role with the transfer of the Canadian Cyber Incident Response Centre (CCIRC) from Public Safety Canada in October 2018.		Yes
China	CNCERT/CC	Founded in September 2002	40	Yes
Colombia	colCERT	Grupo de Respuesta a Emergencias Cibernéticas de Colombia - colCERT		
Croatia	CARNET CERT			Yes
Czech Republic	CSIRT.CZ			Yes
Denmark	DKCERT	Danish Computer Security Incident Response Team		Yes
Denmark	CFCS-DK	Centre for Cyber Security		Yes
Ecuador	ECUCERT	Centro de Respuesta a Incidentes Informáticos del Ecuador		Yes
Egypt	EG-CERT	Work as trust center for Cyber Security Services across Egyptian cyber space.		Yes
Estonia	CERT-EE	The national and governmental Computer Emergency Response Team for Estonia.		Yes
Europe	CERT-EU	Computer Emergency Response Team (CERT-EU) for the EU institutions, agencies and bodies.		Yes
Eurocontrol	EATM-CERT	European Air Traffic Management Computer Emergency Response Team		
Finland	NCSC-FI	National Cyber Security Centre of Finland		Yes
France	CERT-FR			Yes
Georgia	CERT.OTA.GOV.GE	Operative-Technical Agency of Georgia		Yes
Germany	CERT-Bund			Yes
Ghana	NCA-CERT, CERT-GH	National Communications Authority Computer Emergency Response Team and National Cyber Security Centre of Ghana.		
Hong Kong	HKCERT	Hong Kong Computer Emergency Response Team Coordination Center.		Yes
Iceland	CERT-IS	The national Computer Emergency Response Team for Iceland as part of the Post and Telecommunication Administration in Iceland		Yes
India	CERT-In	CERT-In		Yes
Indonesia	ID-SIRTII/CC	Indonesia Security Incident Response Team on Internet Infrastructure coordination centre was founded in 2007.		Yes
Iran	CERT MAHER	Maher Center of Iranian National Computer Emergency Response Team		
Israel	CERT-IL	The Israeli Cyber Emergency Response Team is part of Israel National Cyber Directorate		Yes
Italia	CSIRT Italia	Established at the National Cybersecurity Agency for the implementation of the NIS Directive in Italy absorbed previous CERT-PA and CERT-Nazionale.		
Japan	JPCERT/CC			Yes
Japan	IPA-CERT			Yes
Jersey	CERT-JE	Jersey Cyber Emergency Response Team. Established 2021.		
Kazakhstan	KZ-CERT	KZ-CERT National сomputer emergency response team		Yes
Kyrgyzstan	CERT-KG			
Laos	LaoCERT	Lao Computer Emergency Response Team		
Latvia	CERT.LV	The Information Technology Security Incident Response Institution of the Republic of Latvia.		Yes
Lithuania	NRD CIRT	NRD Cyber Security Incident Response Team. It is the first private incident response team in Lithuania.		Yes
Luxembourg	CIRCL	CIRCL is the CERT for the private sector, communes and non-governmental entities in Luxembourg.		Yes
Macau	MOCERT			
Malaysia	MyCERT	The Malaysia Computer Emergency Response Team was established in 1997. It is now part of CyberSecurity Malaysia		Yes
Mexico	CERT-MX	The Centre of Expertise in Technological Response, is part of the Scientific Division of the Federal Police (Mexico)		Yes
Moldova	CERT-GOV-MD	Center for Response on Cybersecurity Incidents – CERT-GOV-MD		Yes
Mongolia	MNCERT/CC	Mongolian Cyber Emergency Response Team / Coordination Center. Founded in 2014.		Yes
Morocco	maCERT			Yes
Netherlands	National Cyber Security Centre	Operates the national CERT		
Netherlands	SURFcert	Computer Emergence Response Team for the Dutch research and education network.		Yes
New Zealand	National Cyber Security Centre (NCSC)	Operates the national CERT		Yes
Nigeria	ngCERT			Yes
Norway	NorCERT	Cyber Security Center and national CERT of Norway. Part of the National Security Authority (NSM).		Yes
Pakistan	PakCERT			
Papua New Guinea	PNGCERT			
Philippines	CSP-CERT	CyberSecurity Philippines – CERT, established in 2016 the very first Non-profit CSIRT/CERT organization in the Philippines.		
Poland	CERT Polska	Operated by the research institute NASK; performs the tasks of CSIRT NASK, one of three national-level CSIRTs under Poland's National Cybersecurity System Act of 2018 (alongside CSIRT GOV, run by the Internal Security Agency, and CSIRT MON, run by the Ministry of National Defence).		Yes
Portugal	CERT.PT	Part of the National Cyber Security Center (CNCS) of Portugal		Yes
Qatar	Q-CERT			Yes
Republic of Ireland	CSIRT-IE			
Romania	CERT-RO	Centrul Naţional de Răspuns la Incidente de Securitate Cibernetică – CERT-RO		
Russia	GOV-CERT			
Russia	RU-CERT			Yes
Russia	CERT-GIB			
Russia	BI.ZONE-CERT			
Russia	Financial CERT	Financial Sector Computer Emergency Response Team (special division of the Bank of Russia)		Yes
Russia	KASPERSKY ICS CERT			
Russia	NCIRCC			
Saudi Arabia	Saudi-CERT	Saudi CERT has three main functions: increasing the level of knowledge and awareness regarding cybersecurity, disseminate information about vulnerabilities, and campaigns and cooperating with other response teams. Saudi CERT serves different stakeholder in the country including individuals business and government agencies. And proactive and reactive services.		Yes
Serbia	SRB-CERT	National CERT of the Republic of Serbia		Yes
Serbia	MUP CERT	Centar za reagovanje na napade na informacioni sistem		Yes
Singapore	SingCERT	Singapore Cyber Emergency Response Team		Yes
Slovakia	SK-CERT	Národná jednotka SK-CERT| National unit SK-CERT		Yes
Slovenia	SI-CERT	Slovenian Computer Emergency Response Team, part of ARNES		Yes
Slovenia	SIGOV-CERT	Specifically formed for information security in the government sector of Slovenia		
South Africa	CSHUB-CSIRT	CyberSecurity Hub CSIRT established by the Department of Telecommunications and Postal Services		
South Korea	KrCERT/CC			Yes
Spain	CCN-CERT	Centro Criptológico Nacional		Yes
Sri Lanka	SL CERT | CC	Computer Emergency Readiness Team | Co-ordination Center		Yes
Sweden	CERT-SE			Yes
Switzerland	GovCERT.ch	The parent organisation of GovCERT.ch is the Swiss Reporting and Analysis Centre for Information Assurance (MELANI)		Yes
Taiwan	TWCERT/CC			Yes
Thailand	ThaiCERT			Yes
Togo	CERT-TG	Togo - Computer Emergency Response Team		Yes
Tonga	CERT Tonga			
Turkey	TR-CERT (USOM)			Yes
Uganda	CERT.UG; RENU CERT	Uganda National Computer Emergency Response Team /CC (Absorbed UG-CERT); RENU - Computer Emergency Response Team (CERT)		Yes
Ukraine	FS Group	FS Group – CERT		Yes
Ukraine	CERT-UA	Computer Emergency Response Team of Ukraine		Yes
United Arab Emirates	aeCERT	The United Arab Emirates – Computer Emergency Response Team		Yes
United Kingdom	National Cyber Security Centre	Absorbed CERT-UK		Yes
United States	CISA	Part of the United States Department of Homeland Security		Yes
United States	CERT/CC	Created by the Defense Advanced Research Projects Agency (DARPA) and run by the Software Engineering Institute (SEI) at the Carnegie Mellon University		Yes
Uzbekistan	UzCERT	Computer Emergency Response Team of Uzbekistan		
Vietnam	VNCERT	Vietnam CERT		Yes

== See also ==
- Computer security incident management
- Critical infrastructure protection
- Information security
- Network operations center
