= Q-CERT =

The Qatar Computer Emergency Response Team was created in December 2006 by CERT/CC and ictQATAR. It is Qatar's coordination center in dealing with internet security problems.

== History ==
Q-CERT was the first-ever CERT to be established in the Middle East. Plans for Q-CERT were first announced in December 2006 after ictQATAR and the CERT Coordination Center entered into a partnership. It signed a cooperation agreement with the SANS Institute to provide training courses in cyber security for IT specialists in Qatar's government. In November 2016, the first GCC cyber drill was held under the auspices of Q-CERT and was engaged in by internet security specialists from four GCC countries.

== Goals ==
The goals of Q-CERT are to:

1. Create awareness of cybersecurity in private-public institutions and the public;
2. Provide proactive and guided approaches for managing ICT security in the civil society;
3. Assist private-public stakeholders in managing risks and vulnerabilities against the country's information infrastructures;
4. Ensure integrity and confidentiality of data crucial to the wide range of online services that will be offered;
5. Introduce cybercrime laws and privacy laws and educate the public on their rights.

== See also ==
- CERT/CC
