= Macau Computer Emergency Response Team Coordination Centre =

- Founded: 2010
- Headquarters: Av. Infante D. Henrique, No. 43-53A, 7 Andar, Edf. The Macau Square, Macau SAR, China
- Website: www.mocert.org

Macau Computer Emergency Response Team Coordination Centre (MOCERT) is managed by Macau New Technologies Incubator Centre in providing Macau with computer security incident handling information, promoting information security awareness, as well as coordinating computer security incident response for the public and local enterprises.

MOCERT not only collaborates with local bodies, but also communicates and exchange information with other members of FIRST (Forum of Incident Response and Security Teams) and APCERT (Asia Pacific Computer Emergency Response Teams).

== Services ==
MOCERT's mission is to facilitate a healthy and secure Internet environment for Macau.

MOCERT provides the latest computer vulnerabilities that are discovered around the world, and publishes the latest security issues and advisories in the website. Individuals and organizations can also register for free as a MOCERT subscriber and get the latest related information through email. The organization also provides advice on the best way to handle computer incident for free. MOCERT accepts reports on computer security related incidents, for example, phishing, malware, malicious website, phoney emails and their attachments, and other information security attacks. MOCERT organizes relevant seminars and events to the Macao constituency on a regular basis to promote information security awareness to the Macao public. These events and their topics are altered according to the current issues facing Macao. MOCERT complements these seminars and events, with print material in the form of leaflet or booklets, to sections of the constituency that requires further awareness and guidance in information security.
