= History of the United States Agency for International Development =

Seal of the USAID

When the U.S. government created the United States Agency for International Development (USAID) in November 1961, it built on a legacy of previous development-assistance agencies and their people, budgets, and operating procedures. USAID's predecessor agency was already substantial, with 6,400 U.S. staff in developing-country field missions in 1961. Except for the peak years of the Vietnam War, 1965–70, that was more U.S. field staff than USAID would have in the future, and triple the number USAID has had in field missions in the years since 2000.

Although the size of the development-assistance effort was not new, the 1961 decision to reorganize the government's main development-assistance agency was a landmark in terms of institutional evolution, representing the culmination of twenty years' experience with different organizational forms and procedures, in changing foreign-policy environments.

The new structure created in 1961 "proved to be sturdy and durable". In particular, the U.S. government has maintained since then "the unique American pattern of placing strong resident aid missions in countries that [the U.S. was] helping."

The story of how the base for USAID's structure was built is described below, along with an account of changes that have been made since 1961. (Note: A history of all the programs that USAID has supported since 1961, in scores of countries, plus the evolution of U.S. government policies and academic theories about development and development assistance, to say nothing of the development in the low-income countries themselves, would require enough books to fill a library. For a start, see Butterfield (2004).)

== Background ==
=== Before World War II ===
The realization that early industrializers like the United States could provide technical assistance to other countries' development efforts spread gradually in the late 1800s, leading to a substantial number of visits to other countries by U.S. technical experts, generally with official support by the U.S. government even when the missions were unofficial. Japan, China, Turkey, and several Latin American countries requested missions on subjects like fiscal management, monetary institutions, election management, mining, schooling, roads, flood control, and urban sanitation. The U.S. government also initiated missions, particularly to Central America and the Caribbean, when it felt that U.S. interests might be affected by crises like failed elections, debt defaults, or spread of infectious disease.

U.S. technical missions in this era were not part of a systematic, government-supported program. Possibly the closest approximation to what U.S. government development assistance would become was the China Foundation for the Promotion of Education and Culture, established by the United States in 1924 using funds provided by China as reparations following the Boxer conflict. The foundation's activities ranged widely and included support for development of a leading Chinese university, Tsinghua University.

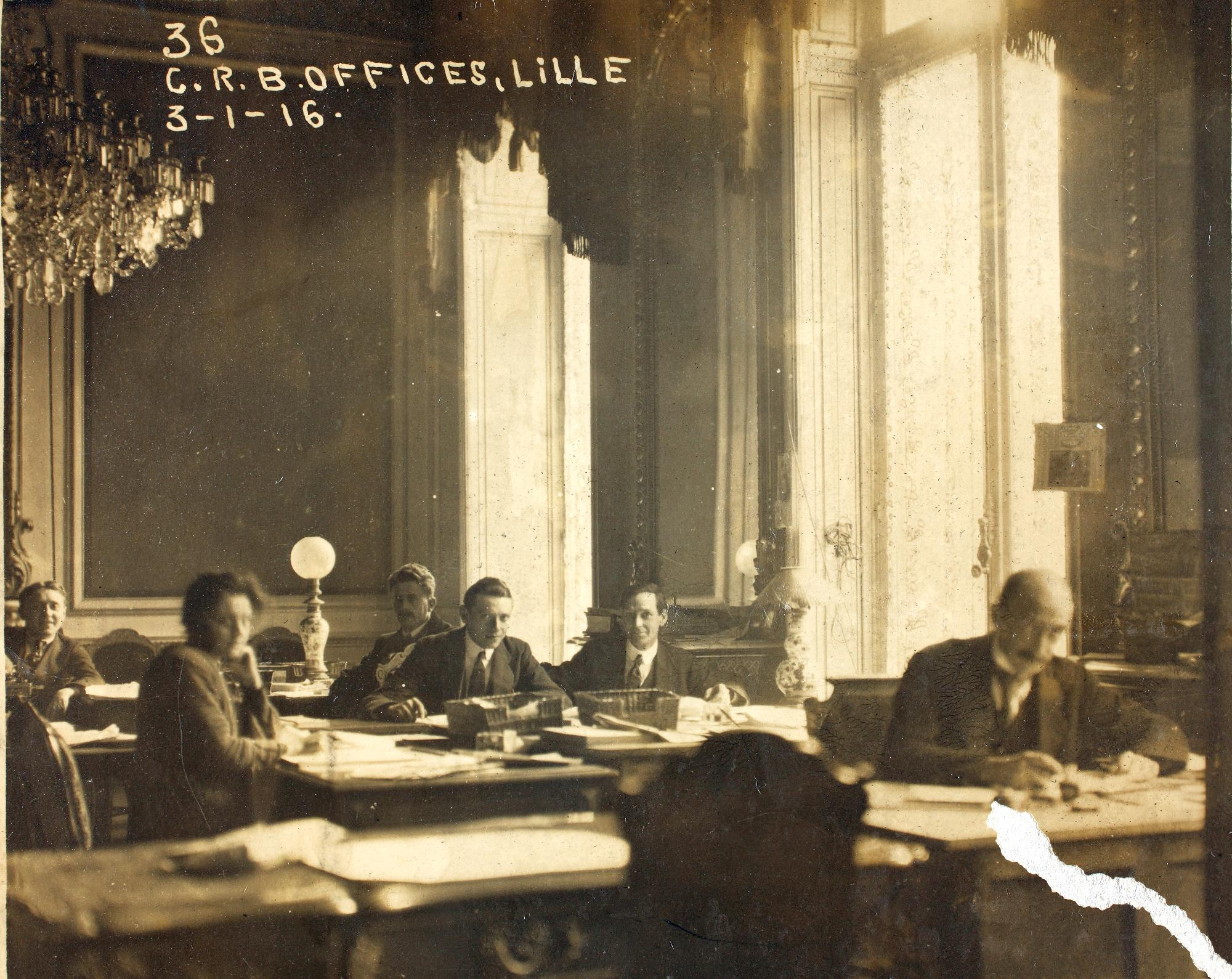
The Committee for Relief in Belgium in Lille, France

A notable early example of U.S. government foreign assistance for disaster relief was its contribution to the 1915 Committee for Relief in Belgium headed by Herbert Hoover, to prevent starvation in Belgium after the German invasion. After World War I in 1919, the U.S. government created the American Relief Administration, also headed by Hoover, which provided food primarily in Eastern Europe.

Between the two world wars, U.S. assistance to low-income countries was often a private initiative, including the work of private foundations such as the Rockefeller Foundation and the Near East Foundation. The Rockefeller Foundation, for example, assisted the breeding of improved maize and wheat varieties in Latin America and supported public health initiatives in Asia.

=== Institutionalization of American development aid ===
The coming of World War II stimulated the U.S. government to create what proved to be permanent, sustained foreign aid programs that evolved into USAID. U.S. development assistance focussed initially on Latin America. Since countries in the region were regularly requesting expert assistance from U.S. cabinet departments, an Interdepartmental Committee on Cooperation with the American Republics was established in 1938, with the State Department in the chair, to ensure systematic responses.

More ambitiously, the U.S. subsequently created an institution that for the first time would take an active role in development assistance programming: the Institute of Inter-American Affairs (IIAA), chartered in March 1942. The institute was the initiative of the Coordinator of Inter-American Affairs, Nelson Rockefeller, the future vice president of the United States, whose family financed the Rockefeller Foundation. IIAA's 1,400 employees provided technical assistance across Central and South America for economic stabilization, food supply, health, and sanitation. The U.S. Department of Agriculture's Office of Foreign Agricultural Relations (OFAR) also began during the war to assist Latin American countries in food production. U.S. benefits included development of sources for raw materials that had been disrupted by the war.

IIAA's operational approach set the pattern for subsequent U.S. government technical assistance in developing countries, including ultimately USAID. In each country, a program comprising a group of projects in a given sector – health, food supply, or schools – was planned and implemented jointly by U.S. and local staff working in an office located in the developing country itself. In IIAA's case the offices were called "servicios".

After the end of the war in 1945, IIAA was transferred to the State Department. Based on positive evaluations from the U.S. Ambassadors in Latin America, the State Department succeeded in getting congressional authorization to extend IIAA, initially through 1950 and then through 1955. OFAR continued to operate separately until 1954 and the Smith-Mundt Act of 1948 also supported technical assistance in agriculture. (Note: OFAR was an office in USDA between 1939 and 1953. In this period, the Foreign Agricultural Service reported to the Department of State rather than to USDA.)

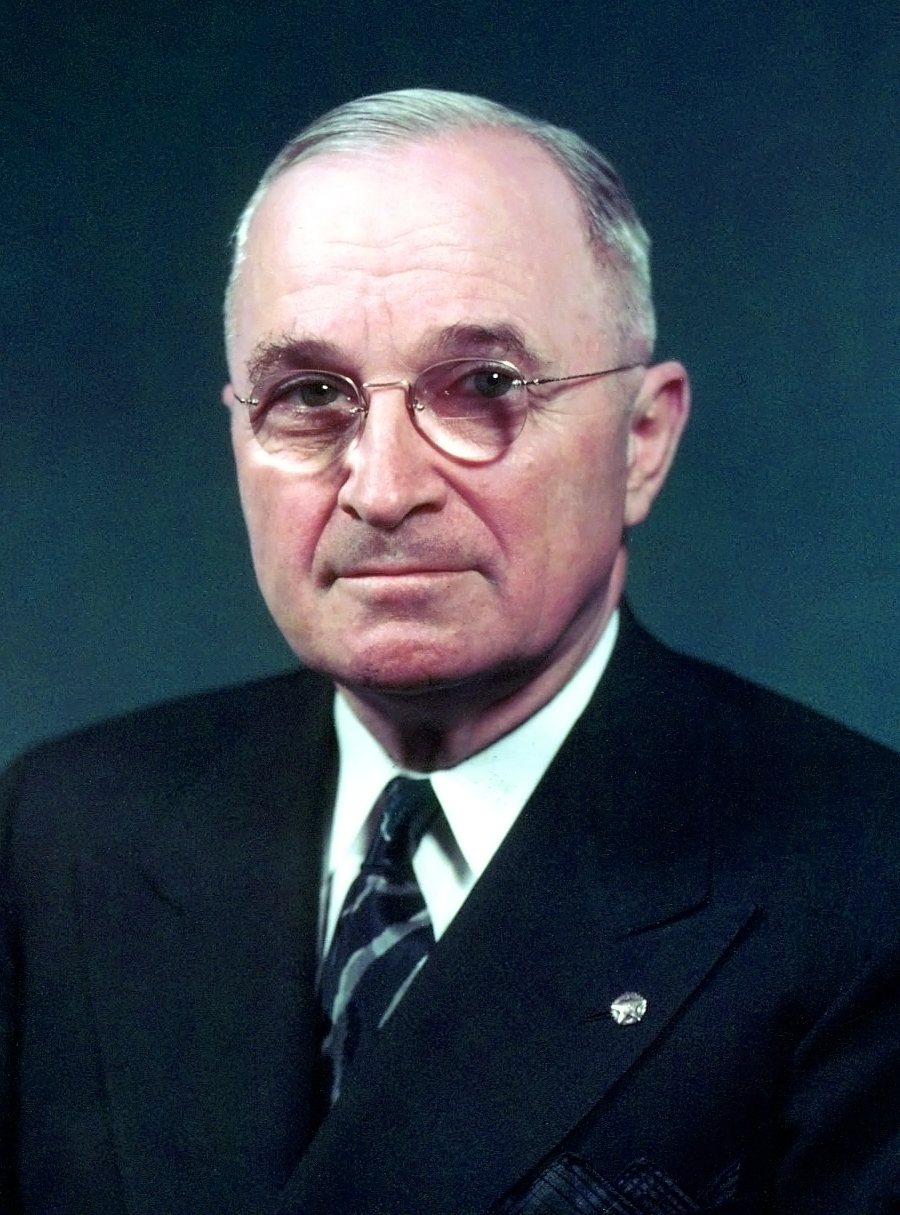
President Truman established the Point IV Program in 1950.

In January 1949, President Truman, responding to advice from staff who had worked with IIAA, proposed a globalized version of the program as the fourth element of his overall foreign policy – "Point IV". The purpose of the program was to provide technical knowledge to aid the growth of underdeveloped countries around the world. After a lengthy debate, Congress approved the Point Four Program in 1950 and the Technical Cooperation Administration (TCA) was established within the Department of State in September 1950 to administer it.

After an initial attempt to operate in the mode of the old Interdepartmental Committee and to merely coordinate programs of other agencies (such as IIAA), TCA adopted an integrated implementation mechanism in November 1951. In an approach that was greatly expanded after 1953, some early technical assistance projects were implemented by U.S. universities under contract to TCA. University project staff in some cases helped perform administrative functions in TCA missions that were in the process of being set up.

=== Maturation of American development-assistance institutions ===
While U.S. government development assistance was institutionalized on a nearly global scale by TCA, strong currents of change in U.S. foreign economic policy during the 1950s affected how development assistance worked and at times called its continued existence into question. When this process finally resulted in the creation of USAID in 1961, USAID continued to use TCA's core mechanism – providing technical assistance led by in-country resident offices – and supplemented it with substantial amounts of financial assistance.

==== Post-war foreign aid ====
Point Four and TCA had been established in the context of several other programs in the large-scale U.S. foreign aid effort of the 1940s. Already during the war, in 1943, the U.S. (jointly with its wartime allies, referred to collectively as "the United Nations") established the "United Nations Relief and Rehabilitation Administration" (UNRRA) for war-affected parts of Europe, China, the Philippines, Korea, and Ethiopia. Immediately after the war, the United States government supplied relief in Germany and Japan, funded by appropriations for "Government and Relief in Occupied Areas" (GARIOA).

Relief was quickly followed by reconstruction assistance. In 1946, the U.S. created a special financial-assistance program for rehabilitation of war damages in its former possession, the Philippines. (Note: By the program's completion in March 1951, the U.S. had provided $388 million for private property claims and $55 million for public property reconstruction. The following month, in April 1951, the U.S. and the Philippines signed an agreement for the U.S. to open an aid office (a Special Technical and Economic Mission).) In 1948, reconstruction assistance was expanded through the Marshall Plan, implemented by the Economic Cooperation Administration (ECA), mainly for Western Europe. In the same year, the U.S. and China established the Joint Commission on Rural Reconstruction, which, starting on the mainland and continuing for two decades in Taiwan, provided sustained development assistance.

Also, the Fulbright Program of academic exchanges was established in 1946, globalizing the wartime program of exchange visits between professionals from Latin America and the United States.

In contrast to the Marshall Plan, Point Four focussed on technical assistance and provided financial assistance only in limited amounts to support its technical initiatives.

In terms of geographic focus, while the Marshall Plan and Point Four mainly operated in different countries, the Marshall Plan also expanded into developing nations. In particular, the Marshall Plan financed activities in:

- Overseas territories of European allies, including territories in Africa.
- "The general area of China" – Cambodia, Laos, Vietnam, Burma, and the Philippines.

In the countries referred to as being in the general area of China, the Marshall Plan (ECA) operated through Special Technical and Economic Missions (STEMs). The STEMs were set up in 1950 and 1951, and had a "Point Four character" in the sense that they emphasized services by technical experts.

Minimizing overlaps with the Marshall Plan, Point Four managed assistance mainly in:

- Latin America (via IIAA).
- India, Pakistan, and Ceylon.

The U.S. also participated in post-1945 UN initiatives for technical assistance to developing countries. Through a series of actions in 1948 and 1949, the UN's General Assembly and Economic and Social Council (ECOSOC) created the Expanded Programme of Technical Assistance (EPTA). The U.S. provided 60% of EPTA's financing. By 1955, EPTA adopted a country-led approach where the UN's TA in each country was programmed according to a plan drawn up by the receiving country in consultation with the UN. ECOSOC also created a new Technical Assistance Board, which (similarly to the United States' wartime Interdepartmental Committee) coordinated the TA being provided to low-income countries by various individual UN agencies.

==== Korean War ====
Coordination between development assistance and the Marshall Plan was tightened in response to the 1950–51 war in Korea. In October 1951 Congress passed the Mutual Security Act, creating the Mutual Security Agency (MSA), which reported directly to the President and supervised both civilian and military assistance. MSA increased the emphasis on large-scale financial assistance to U.S. allies, which was provided as civilian "economic assistance" but was intended to help the allies to make greater military efforts and was therefore often called "defense support". (Note: The name under which Congress appropriates these funds has changed over time, becoming "Supporting Assistance" in 1961, "Security Supporting Assistance" in 1971, and finally "Economic Support Funds" from 1978 to the present.)

The Mutual Security Agency absorbed the Marshall Plan (the ECA), which otherwise had been scheduled to end in 1952. The Technical Cooperation Administration remained a semi-autonomous agency in the State Department to administer Point Four, but after 1951 under the supervision of MSA. Under this coordinated approach, the policy was adopted that ECA and TCA would not both operate in the same country ("one country – one agency"). Accordingly, each agency transferred programs to the other and closed down in some countries. For example, in Indonesia and Burma, ECA closed its financial-assistance programs, while TCA initiated technical assistance.

==== Eisenhower administration ====
In 1953, the administration of Dwight D. Eisenhower took office. The President's party, which had been out of the White House since 1933, (Note: The only times the Republican Party had a majority in either house of Congress in the 48-year span from 1933 to 1981 was in 1947–1949 when it enjoyed small majorities in both houses in the 80th Congress under Pres. Truman and in 1953-1955 when it had majorities in both houses of the 83rd Congress under Pres. Eisenhower.) took a critical view of the previous administrations' policies, including both the globalizing policies of the 1940s and the New Deal initiatives of the 1930s. (Note: The New Deal's Tennessee Valley Authority was the model for some major development assistance projects.)

An overall goal of the new administration was to administer the government efficiently and cut spending. While TCA's technical assistance to developing countries was a small budget item and was considered a long-term program (although fresh funds were appropriated annually), "economic assistance" (or "defense support") was considered an inherently short-term measure. In place of U.S. economic assistance, the Eisenhower administration proposed that U.S. allies should increasingly finance themselves through their own exports: in other words, through "trade not aid". With respect to financial assistance for developing countries, the policy was maintained that it should be provided primarily by the U.S. Export-Import Bank and by the World Bank, (Note: U.S. documents of the 1950s usually referred to the World Bank as "the International Bank".) and that it should be available only on commercial terms and primarily to finance private investment.

To administer the foreign assistance more efficiently, President Eisenhower integrated management into a single agency, the newly created Foreign Operations Administration (FOA). MSA, TCA (which had been under MSA's direction), and IIAA (which had been part of TCA) were all abolished as of August 1953 and their country offices became "United States Operations Missions" (USOMs) under FOA. The President directed other U.S. government agencies to put their technical assistance in developing countries under FOA's management as well. USDA in particular transferred OFAR's programs to FOA, while reconstituting the Foreign Agricultural Service for the task of building global markets for U.S. farm products.

Administrative functions were consolidated as the various agencies came into FOA, and the Mutual Security Act of July 1953 instructed FOA to reduce personnel by at least 10% within 120 days. A large number of TCA's senior professionals were summarily dismissed, and FOA's administrator mounted an effort to compensate for lower U.S. government staffing by drawing on experts from U.S. universities and private voluntary organizations. The ExIm Bank's lending volume in developing countries was also cut dramatically in 1953.

While a "trade not aid" strategy required the U.S. to import more goods from its allies, the administration was unable to convince Congress to liberalize import policy. On the contrary, the main foreign commercial measure taken at this time went in the other direction: the U.S. ramped up subsidies for exports of U.S. agricultural products. The 1953 amendment to the Mutual Security Act and the much larger Agricultural Trade Development and Assistance Act of 1954, known as "PL-480", allowed the U.S. government to buy U.S. farm surpluses and sell them in developing countries for inconvertible local currencies. (Note: A currency is "inconvertible" when the government forbids it to be used to buy foreign exchange, so that it can only be spent in the country that issues it.) Much of PL-480's foreign-currency revenue was returned to developing countries as a supplement to U.S. development assistance. PL-480 revenues in the first twenty years were sometimes huge and although PL-480 has become smaller it continues to provide resources to USAID for nutrition and disaster relief programs.

Several factors arose that favored large-scale economic assistance to developing countries, especially in Asia. South Korea needed massive economic assistance after an armistice was finally signed in July 1953, and U.S. economic assistance to South Vietnam increased after the retreat of France in 1954. On a global scale, the Cold War after the death of Joseph Stalin in March 1953 evolved in the direction of rivalry over influence in low-income countries who were seeking financing for their development initiatives. India was a particular case of a country where the U.S. felt it needed to provide economic assistance to balance the USSR's influence, even though India was not a U.S. military ally. These considerations led to advocacy of expanded economic assistance by several voices within the Eisenhower administration: the FOA Director, former Minnesota governor Harold Stassen; national security advisor Charles Douglas Jackson (who drew on advice from MIT economists Max Millikan and Walt Rostow); and leading officials in the State Department and the National Security Council.

In June 1954, Congress raised the ExIm Bank's lending authority from $4.5 billion to $5 billion. Eisenhower also created in December 1954 a Cabinet-level Council on Foreign Economic Policy, which in March 1955 recommended expanded soft loans for development. In April 1955, Eisenhower proposed a special economic fund for Asia.

To implement Congress's August 1954 decision that technical assistance for developing countries should be put back under the State Department, Eisenhower abolished FOA in May 1955 and created the new International Cooperation Administration (ICA) in the State Department. This separated development assistance from military assistance.

==== Resolving debate over foreign aid ====
Some voices in the administration continued to point in the opposite direction: for example, Under Secretary of State Herbert Hoover Jr. and the new ICA head, John Hollister, who represented more frugal attitudes. Given the lack of consensus, Eisenhower and Congress conducted in 1956 several studies to give foreign aid policy a more solid basis. Mainly delivered in early 1957, the reports included an updated version of the essay by Millikan and Rostow that C.D. Jackson had circulated in 1954.

The overall view that emerged was that sustained development assistance would have long-term benefits for the U.S. position in the world and, more specifically, that developing countries needed substantial financial assistance in the form of low-interest loans. Developing countries particularly needed softer financing to invest in public health systems, schools, and economic infrastructure, for which "hard", commercial lending was unsuitable. (Note: An expanding academic literature also featured models that assumed that low-income countries would grow virtually automatically if sufficient macroeconomic financing was provided.) Personnel changes soon reflected this change in the administration's view: Christian Herter succeeded Herbert Hoover Jr. as Under Secretary of State in February 1957, Robert Anderson succeeded George Humphrey as treasury secretary in July 1957, and James H. Smith Jr. replaced John Hollister as ICA Director in September 1957.

Eisenhower summarized the conclusions in his May 21, 1957 message to Congress:

"This past year ... Congressional Committees, the Executive Branch and distinguished private citizens have just examined these programs anew. ... I recommend the following legislative actions: ... economic development assistance should be provided primarily through loans, continuingly, and related closely to technical assistance. ... I recommend a clear separation of military and defense support assistance on the one hand, from economic development assistance on the other. ... I recommend that long[-]term development assistance be provided from a Development Loan Fund. ... Such loans should not compete with or replace such existing sources of credit [to] private investors, the International Bank [the World Bank], or the Export-Import Bank. ... I believe the Fund should be established and administered in the International Cooperation Administration. ... The technical cooperation program is one of the most valuable elements of our entire mutual security effort. It also should be continued on a long-term basis and must be closely related to the work of the Fund."

As a result, the Development Loan Fund was established in August 1957. The DLF largely financed infrastructure (such as railroads, highways, and power plants), factories, and agriculture with loans whose terms were relatively "soft" in the sense of charging interest rates lower than commercial levels and being repayable in local currency rather than U.S. dollars. (Note: Local-currency repayments were adjusted when exchange rates changed to maintain their value in terms of U.S. dollars.) Some projects were financed by a combination of a DLF soft loan and a harder World Bank loan. Operationally, the DLF became administratively self-contained by 1959 after contracting for administrative support from ICA for its first two years. Also, the Export-Import Bank's lending limit was raised in 1958 from $5 billion to $7 billion, and the administration advocated in January 1959 an expanded "food for peace" program.

The overall trend in U.S. government development-assistance activity in the 1950s is indicated by the change in the number of U.S. staff in field missions, which during Eisenhower's years in office from 1953 to 1961 rose from 2,839 to 6,387.

==== Multilateral Initiatives ====
As the U.S. expanded its development-assistance efforts in the course of the 1950s, other industrial countries were recovering economically from World War II and were increasingly able to engage in development assistance. The U.S. supported their involvement through several multilateral initiatives.

Three of these initiatives expanded World Bank facilities.

- In November 1954, the U.S. decided to endorse the World Bank's proposed International Finance Corporation, which would raise funds from global capital markets to lend to the private sector in developing countries. The IFC was finally established in 1956.
- With Senator Mike Monroney playing a prominent role, Congress approved in July 1958 another new World Bank facility, the International Development Association (IDA). Funded by grants from industrialized countries, the IDA would make low-interest credits to developing countries for projects like public works. The IDA formally came into being in September 1960, with the U.S. contributing 42% of its initial resources.
- Also in 1958, the United States proposed doubling industrialized countries' contributions to the World Bank, raising the bank's capitalization from $10 billion to $21 billion in September 1959.

While the U.S. supported expanded World Bank facilities, it did not support the proposal for a Special UN Fund for Economic Development (SUNFED). The UN did create a "Special Fund" in 1957, but it was limited to designing projects for the UN's technical assistance program, EPTA, and could not finance public works.

The U.S. also adopted a regional initiative with Latin America. Through most of the 1950s, the U.S. concentrated on technical assistance in the region. Financial assistance sources were limited to the Eximbank and the World Bank, with the U.S. opposing proposals for a regional development bank. Events in 1958 – notably a riot during Vice President Nixon's visit to Caracas, Venezuela, in May 1958 – resulted in a reversal of the U.S. position in August 1958. With U.S. support, in April 1959 the Organization of American States created the Inter-American Development Bank, most of whose capital was contributed by the borrowing countries.

To further engage other wealthy countries in development assistance, the United States supported the creation of the Aid India Consortium in August 1958. This was the first of several informal groupings of donors focussing on particular countries.

The United States also encouraged Western Europe and Japan to increase their development assistance by building on the European Marshall Plan organization, the Organization of European Economic Cooperation (OEEC). The OEEC had been created in 1948 by recipients of Marshall Plan aid, at the request of the United States government, to decide on allocation of that aid within Europe, and by the late 1950s it had fulfilled its original mandate. In January 1960, Eisenhower and Under Secretary of State C. Douglas Dillon got agreement from OEEC members to create a Development Assistance Group composed of the OEEC members who were the main sources of development assistance, along with non-members who were major donors – the U.S., Canada, and Japan. (Note: NATO was also considered as a possible institutional base for cooperation between Western Europe and North America on development assistance.) In 1961, the OEEC itself was restructured to become the Organisation for Economic Co-operation and Development, which established a Development Assistance Committee (DAC) as a restructured DAG that was brought under the OECD. This effort resulted in informal agreements to increase budgets for development assistance. Several participating countries also established new agencies to manage development assistance.

== Creation of USAID and Decade of Development ==
At the end of the 1950s, the momentum in favor of development assistance – as represented by PL-480, new mechanisms for financial assistance, larger U.S. budgets and staffing, and multilateral initiatives – picked up support from Senator John F. Kennedy, who was preparing to be a candidate for the presidency. In 1957, JFK proposed, in bipartisan collaboration with Sen. John Sherman Cooper (a former U.S. Ambassador to India), a major expansion of U.S. economic support for India. As a candidate in 1960, he supported the emphasis on humanitarian goals for PL-480 set by Sen. Hubert Humphrey's "Food for Peace" Act of 1959 and supported the idea of a Peace Corps that was under development thanks to the initiatives of Sen. Humphrey, Rep. Reuss, and Sen. Neuberger. (Note: Until 1973, USAID and its predecessors also supported International Voluntary Services, which was founded in 1953.)

After his inauguration as president on January 20, 1961, JFK created the Peace Corps by Executive Order on March 1, 1961. On March 22, he sent a special message to Congress on foreign aid, asserting that the 1960s should be a "Decade of Development" and proposing to unify U.S. development assistance administration into a single agency. He sent a proposed "Act for International Development" to Congress in May and the resulting "Foreign Assistance Act" was approved in September, repealing the Mutual Security Act. In November, Kennedy signed the act and issued an Executive Order tasking the Secretary of State to create, within the State Department, the "Agency for International Development" (or A.I.D.: subsequently re-branded as USAID), (Note: The names of predecessor agencies often continued in popular usage. In Vietnam in the 1960s, it was common to refer to A.I.D.'s office as "USOM," while in Peru A.I.D. telephone operators continued in the 1960s to answer calls saying "Punto Cuatro" (Point Four).) as the successor to both ICA and the Development Loan Fund. (Note: In 1966, the UN would also integrate its EPTA and the Special Fund into a new agency, the UN Development Program, or UNDP.)

With these actions, the U.S. created a permanent agency working with administrative autonomy under the policy guidance of the State Department to implement, through resident field missions, a global program of both technical and financial development assistance for low-income countries. This structure has continued to date. (Note: The Fulbright educational and cultural exchange program was also strengthened by the Fulbright-Hays Act in September 1961.)

Taking this momentum onto the world stage via an address to the UN General Assembly in September 1961, Kennedy called for a "United Nations Decade of Development". This initiative was endorsed by a General Assembly resolution in December, establishing the concepts of development and development assistance as global priorities.

== New Directions Act ==
In the late 1960s, foreign aid became one of the focal points in Legislative-Executive differences over the Vietnam War. In September 1970, President Nixon proposed abolishing USAID and replacing it with three new institutions: one for development loans, one for technical assistance and research, and one for trade, investment and financial policy. USAID's field missions would have been eliminated in the new institutional setup. Consistent with this approach, in early 1971 President Nixon transferred the administration of private investment programs from USAID to the Overseas Private Investment Corporation (OPIC), which had been established by foreign aid legislation at the end of 1969.

Congress did not act on the President's proposal for replacing USAID but rather amended the Foreign Assistance Act to direct that USAID emphasize "Basic Human Needs": food and nutrition; population planning and health; and education and human resources development. Specifically, USAID's budget would be reformed to account for expenditures for each of these Basic Human Needs, a system referred to as "functional accounts". (Previously, budgets had been divided between categories such as "development loans, technical assistance, Alliance for Progress [for Latin America], loans and grants, and population.") The new system was based on a proposal developed by a bipartisan group of House members and staff working with USAID management and outside advisors. President Nixon signed the New Directions Act into law (PL 93-189) in December 1973.

Also in 1973, the "Percy Amendment" of the Foreign Assistance Act required U.S. development assistance to integrate women into its programs, leading to USAID's creation of its Women in Development (WID) office in 1974. The Helms Amendment of 1973 banned use of U.S. government funds for abortion as a method of family planning, which effectively required USAID to eliminate all support for abortion.

A further amendment of the Foreign Assistance Act in 1974 prohibited assistance for police, thus ending USAID's involvement in Public Safety programs in Latin America, which in the 1960s were, along with the Vietnam War, part of the U.S. government's anti-Communist strategy.

The reforms also ended the practice of the 1960s and 1970s in which many USAID officers in Latin America and Southeast Asia had worked in joint offices led by State Department diplomats or in units with U.S. military personnel.

The Basic Human Needs reforms largely cut off USAID's assistance to higher education. A large part of that assistance had gone to agricultural universities in hungry developing countries, as illustrated by a 1974 book by a University of Illinois professor, Hadley Read, describing USAID-supported U.S. land-grant universities' work in building India's agricultural universities. Read's book inspired an Illinois Member of Congress concerned with famine prevention, Paul Findley, to draft a bill authorizing more support for programs like the ones Read described. In a legislative process involving USAID staff, the association of state universities and land-grant colleges (NASULGC), and Sen. Hubert Humphrey, Rep. Findley's bill ultimately became Title XII of the Foreign Assistance Act, via an amendment to the FAA passed in 1975. Title XII created the Board for International Food and Agricultural Development (BIFAD), with seven members representing U.S. universities and agricultural technology institutions who advise USAID on Title XII implementation.

The impact of all these actions of the early 1970s on the overall scale of U.S. development assistance is indicated by the change in the number of U.S. staff in field missions. In 1969, the year when Nixon took office, the number was already decreasing from its Vietnam War high of 8,717 and had reached 7,701. By 1976, near the end of the Nixon-Agnew and Ford-Rockefeller administrations, it was 2,007.

== Evolving organizational linkages with the State Department ==
Foreign aid has always operated within the framework of U.S. foreign policy and the organizational linkages between the Department of State and USAID have been reviewed on many occasions.

In 1978, legislation drafted at the request of Senator Hubert Humphrey was introduced to create a Cabinet-level International Development Cooperation Agency (IDCA), whose intended role was to supervise USAID in place of the State Department. Established by executive order in September 1979, it did not in practice make USAID independent.

In 1995, legislation to abolish USAID was introduced by Senator Jesse Helms, the chairman of the Senate Foreign Relations Committee, who aimed to replace USAID with a grant-making foundation. Although the House of Representatives passed a bill abolishing USAID, the measure did not become law. To gain congressional cooperation for his foreign affairs agenda, President Bill Clinton adopted in 1997 a State Department proposal to integrate more foreign affairs agencies into the department. The "Foreign Affairs Agencies Consolidation Act of 1998" (Division G of PL 105-277) abolished IDCA, the Arms Control and Disarmament Agency, and the United States Information Agency, which formerly maintained American libraries overseas. Although the law authorized the president to abolish USAID, President Clinton did not exercise this option.

In 2003, President Bush established PEPFAR, the President's Emergency Plan for AIDS Relief, putting USAID's HIV/AIDS programs under the direction of the State Department's new Office of the Global AIDS Coordinator.

In 2004, the Bush administration created the Millennium Challenge Corporation (MCC) as a new foreign aid agency to provide financial assistance to a limited number of countries selected for good performance in socioeconomic development. The MCC also finances some USAID-administered development assistance projects.

In January 2006, Secretary of State Condoleezza Rice created the Office of the Director of U.S. Foreign Assistance ('F') within the State Department. Under a director with the rank of deputy secretary, F's purpose was to ensure that foreign assistance would be used as much as possible to meet foreign policy objectives. F integrated foreign assistance planning and resource management across State and USAID, directing all USAID offices' budgets according to a detailed "Standardized Program Structure" comprising hundreds of "Program Sub-Elements". USAID accordingly closed its Washington office that had been responsible for development policy and budgeting.

On September 22, 2010, President Barack Obama signed a Presidential Policy Determination (PPD) on Global Development. (Although the Administration considered the PPD too sensitive for release to the public, it was finally released in February 2014 as required by a U.S. court order. The Administration had initially provided a fact sheet to describe the policy.) The PPD promised to elevate the role of development assistance within U.S. policy and rebuild "USAID as the U.S. Government's lead development agency." It also established an Interagency Policy Committee on Global Development led by the National Security Staff and added to U.S. development efforts an emphasis on innovation. To implement the PPD's instruction that "USAID will develop robust policy, planning, and evaluation capabilities," USAID re-created in mid-2010 a development planning office, the Bureau of Policy, Planning, and Learning.

On November 23, 2010, USAID announced the creation of a new Bureau for Food Security to lead the implementation of President Obama's Feed the Future Initiative, which had formerly been managed by the State Department.

On December 21, 2010, Secretary of State Clinton released the Quadrennial Diplomacy and Development Review (QDDR). Modeled after the military's Quadrennial Defense Review, the QDDR of 2010 reaffirmed the plan to re-build USAID's Foreign Service staffing while also emphasizing the increased role that staff from the State Department and domestic agencies would play in implementing U.S. assistance. In addition, it laid out a program for a future transfer of health sector assistance back from the State Department to USAID. The follow-on QDDR released in April 2015 reaffirmed the Administration's policies.

== Changes during the second Trump administration ==
=== Initial 90-day freeze ===
On January 24, 2025, President Donald Trump ordered a near-total freeze on all foreign aid. In February, the administration placed most employees on administrative leave. The absence of authorization from Congress led to lawsuits against the Trump administration. Also in February, the administration made several allegations of wasteful spending and fraud, allegations which were generally reported to be false.

Several days later, Secretary of State Marco Rubio issued a waiver for humanitarian aid. However, a key issue developed over whether the waivers for lifesaving aid were actually translating into aid flowing. Despite the waiver, there was still much confusion about what agencies should do. More than 1,000 USAID employees and contractors were fired or furloughed following the near-total freeze on U.S. global assistance that the second Trump administration implemented.

On January 27, 2025, the agency's official government website was shut down.

=== Role of Elon Musk ===
On January 30, 2025, Elon Musk demanded that Jason Gray, acting administrator of USAID at that time, shut off email and cellphone access for USAID workers around the world, including in conflict zones. Gray refused, saying that doing so would put their lives at risk. By the next day, Gray was removed from his post.

On February 3, 2025, Elon Musk, who has been carrying out parts of Trump's cost-cutting agenda, announced that he and Trump were in the process of shutting down USAID, claiming it to be a "criminal organization" and that it was "beyond repair". USAID's Inspector General had previously launched a probe into Starlink, which is operated by Musk; this led to concerns that Musk's role in the agency's downsizing constituted a conflict of interest.

=== Role of U.S. Secretary of State Marco Rubio ===
On February 3, 2025, Secretary of State Marco Rubio announced his appointment as Acting Administrator of USAID by President Trump and that USAID was being merged into the State Department. The legality of these actions is disputed given the mandate for the agency's creation in the Foreign Assistance Act.

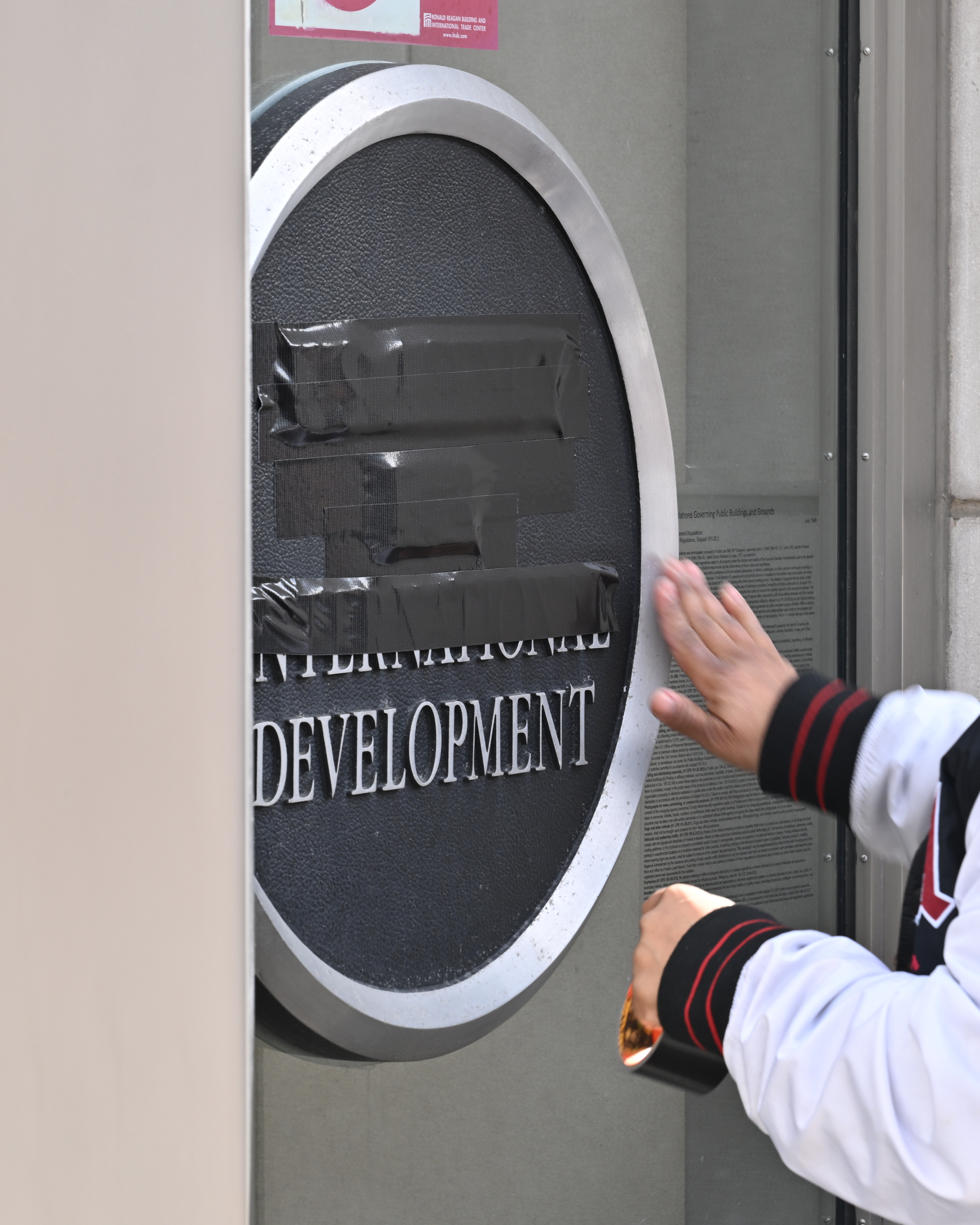
Taping over a USAID sign at the Ronald Reagan Building in Washington, DC on February 7, 2025

It was announced that on February 6, 2025, at 11:59 pm (EST) all USAID direct hire personnel would be placed on administrative leave globally, with the exception of designated personnel responsible for mission-critical functions, core leadership and specially designated programs.

=== Initial effects on health assistance ===
On February 6, 2025, reports indicated that the total number of employees to be retained was 294, out of a total of more than 10,000. Trump declared that agency leaders were "radical left lunatics", while the State Department ordered them to halt virtually all their projects, even if that meant ceasing programs that helped to eradicate smallpox and prevented millions of HIV cases. The freeze in HIV relief programs, including PEPFAR, is estimated to jeopardize treatment access for 20 million people, including 500,000 children. This drastic action led to sudden pauses in over 30 clinical trials for ailments such as HIV, malaria, cholera, cervical cancer, and tuberculosis, leaving participants with medical devices in their bodies and cut off from researchers, likely going against the principles of the Declaration of Helsinki.

=== Initial effects on wartime assistance ===
It also led to a pause in other efforts such as wartime help in Ukraine, hospital assistance in Syria, education programs in Mali, and conservation efforts in the Amazon rainforest. On February 6, CBS News reported that due to the civil war in Sudan, often called the “Forgotten War” because it receives comparatively little attention compared to the Ukraine and Gaza, an estimated 3 million children under age 5 are suffering from acute malnutrition. The American Farm Bureau Federation stated, "AID plays a critical role in reducing hunger around the world while sourcing markets for the surplus foods America's farmers and ranchers grow".

=== Criticism of USAID termination ===
Andrew Natsios, the administrator for USAID during the George W. Bush administration, told PBS that, "With all due respect, none of these people know anything about AID. What does Musk know about international development? Absolutely nothing. He has a bunch of young kids in their 20s. They don't know. They're techies. They don't know anything about international development. They don't know anything about the Global South. They don't know anything about these — the programs and policies of the agency. AID is the most pro-business and pro-market of all aid agencies in the world. I can tell you that categorically. I am a conservative Republican. I'm not a liberal. And I have served in repeated Republican administrations."

Michael Sobolik, a China analyst at the conservative Hudson Institute think tank and a former aide to Senator Ted Cruz (R-Texas), has stated, "Sure, USAID was doing some highly questionable stuff that’s worthy of review. But don’t throw the baby out with the bathwater. Beijing is hoping we do exactly that."

=== Reduction to 17% of programs ===
On March 10, 2025, U.S. Secretary of State Marco Rubio announced that the Trump administration had concluded its review, and 83% of USAID's programs would be cancelled, involving approximately 5,200 contracts.

=== Gavi Foundation ===
On March 24, 2025, the Department of Government Efficiency (DOGE) announced the termination of a $2.63 billion grant from USAID to the Gavi Foundation because the Gavi Foundation "prioritizes 'zero-dose' children who have not received a single vaccine shot as well as missed communities. The zero-dose agenda is also a key priority for the global community’s immunization agenda 2030, which was endorsed by the World Health Assembly in May 2020." DOGE stated the United States federal government saved $1.75 billion by cancelling the grant, which was 6.575% of the total USAID budget.

=== Some UN World Food Programme grants added back ===
On April 8, 2025, USAID announced it was making some exceptions to the recent announcement of cancelled participation in the UN's World Food Programme. Specifically, USAID was restoring food aid to Lebanon, Syria, Somalia, Jordan, Iraq and Ecuador, and other countries for a total of 14 nations (plus the International Organization for Migration in the Pacific region). However, food aid was not restored to Yemen or Afghanistan with a State Department spokesperson saying this was “based on concern that the funding was benefiting terrorist groups, including the Houthis and the Taliban.”

=== Potential competition with China ===
As the United States cuts back on foreign aid, China may increase their efforts and funding as a way to gain influence. Senator Roger Wicker (R-Mississippi) said, "I have felt for a long time that USAID is our way to combat the [$1 trillion] Belt and Road Initiative, which is China's effort to really gain influence around the world, including Africa and South America in the Western Hemisphere." In addition, China often completes such projects on the basis of loans, not grants. Since 2000, African countries have been the recipient of over $182 billion in Chinese loans, with interest rates averaging about 3% (higher than rates from the World Bank but lower than the 6–7% rates from private lenders.

Democrats on the House Select China Committee have put together talking points on how cutting aid too aggressively may give a win to China on the world stage.

In February 2025, China pledged an additional $4.4 million to de-mining efforts in Cambodia.

Regarding the March 28 Myanmar earthquake, a U.S. State Department spokesperson stated that the United States is working through local partners in Myanmar, and said, “The success in the work and our impact will still be there.” However, a former USAID mission head in Myanmar said, “This is the new normal. This is what it looks like when the United States sits on the international sidelines, when the United States is a weaker international player, when it cedes the space to other global players like China.”

Two experienced U.S. rescue teams were not able to travel to Myanmar because of lack of prompt financing and lack of experienced USAID employees to serve as guides. State Department spokesperson Tammy Bruce said, “I would reject the premise that the sign of success is that we are physically there.” And in fact, a large part of the U.S. effort in previous disasters has been to support local clinics, businesses, and local and international relief organizations. Often, there are secondary crisis(es) from diseases such as cholera which can appear in the days and weeks following a disaster.

On April 4, 2025, the U.S. committed an extra $7 million to help with the Myanmar earthquake, thereby increasing its commitment from $2 to $9 million.

=== Lawsuits and legal action ===
==== American Federation of Government Employees v. Trump ====
A lawsuit was filed on February 6, 2025, by the American Foreign Service Association and the American Federation of Government Employees in the US District Court for the District of Columbia, requesting a temporary restraining order and preliminary injunction against the administration, claiming that it violated separation of powers, the Take Care Clause of the Constitution, and the Administrative Procedure Act and requesting that all attempts to shut down the agency be halted, all recent actions be reversed, and a new acting director be appointed. The following day, U.S. District Judge Carl Nichols, nominated by President Trump in 2019, stated from the bench that he would enter in a "temporary restraining order", pausing the plan to put thousands of employees on leave and pausing the accelerated removal of workers from their posts abroad.

On February 21, 2025, Judge Nichols cleared the way for the Trump administration to move forward with pulling thousands of USAID staffers off the job in the United States and around the world, as part of an administration plan to also provide those abroad with a 30-day deadline to move back to the U.S. at government expense. Nichols had previously argued that Trump's actions threaten the safety of USAID workers abroad because many are deployed in unstable regions.

==== AIDS Vaccine Advocacy Coalition v. Department of State ====
On February 10, 2025, the AIDS Vaccine Advocacy Coalition and the Journalism Development Network filed suit in the U.S. District Court for the District of Columbia, seeking a preliminary injunction that would prevent the enforcement of Executive Order 14169, along with an order reinstating foreign assistance funding.

On February 13, 2025, U.S. district court Judge Amir Ali granted a temporary restraining order (TRO) and told the government to pay $2 billion in funds that were owed to aid agencies. The government did not comply, leading the plaintiffs to return to court to seek enforcement, and Judge Ali gave the government until February 26 to comply. The Trump administration appealed that ruling to the U.S. Court of Appeals for the District of Columbia, also requesting a stay pending appeal; the stay was rejected. The administration then appealed to the U.S. Supreme Court, asking the court to vacate the TRO and grant the stay while the appeal proceeded in the appeals court.

On March 5, 2025, the United States Supreme Court ruled 5-4 that the federal government must pay for projects already completed. Voting in the majority were the 3 Democratic appointees, Chief Justice Roberts, and Justice Barrett; voting in the minority were the other 4 Republican appointees. However, Federal Judge Ali was ordered to proceed with "due regard for the feasibility of any compliance timelines." On March 6, Judge Ali ruled that at least some payments for completed work must be made by March 10. On March 10, Judge Ali ruled that the Trump administration must pay for projects completed by February 13 at the rate of 300 back payments a day, meaning four days for all 1,200 back payments. On March 11, ABC News reported that, until recently, no payments were being made because DOGE had disabled the payment system. On March 20, Reuters reported that the Trump administration is close to paying the $671 million owed to the organizations which sued.

Case	Court	Case no.(s)	First filing date	Outcome	Notes
American Foreign Service Association, et al. v. Trump, et al.	U.S. District Court for the District of Columbia	1:25-cv-00352	February 6, 2025		
AIDS Vaccine Advocacy Coalition, et al. v. United States Department of State, et al.	U.S. District Court for the District of Columbia	1:25-cv-00400	February 10, 2025		
Global Health Council, et al. v. Trump, et al.	U.S. District Court for the District of Columbia	1:25-cv-00402	February 11, 2025		
Personal Services Contractor Association v. Trump, et al.	U.S. District Court for the District of Columbia	1:25-cv-00469	February 18, 2025		

==== Lawsuit which claimed Musk needed Senate confirmation ====
On March 18, 2025, U.S. District Judge Theodore Chuang ruled that Musk's and DOGE's actions in placing USAID employees on leave were likely unconstitutional. Judge Chuang issued a preliminary injunction against further employees being placed on leave, buildings being closed, or websites having their contents deleted.

On March 28, 2025, the U.S. Fourth Circuit Court of Appeals overruled Judge Chuang on the preliminary injunction, without deciding the merits. Judge Marvin Quattlebaum wrote, “And none of this is to say that plaintiffs will not be able to develop evidence of unconstitutional conduct as the case progresses. Time will tell.”

On August 18, 2025, Chuang certified the case as a class action on behalf of all USAID employees and personal services contractors who were employed by or contracted to the agency on January 27, 2025, rejecting the administration's argument that the class was overbroad.

In February 2026, Chuang ruled that Musk could be deposed about his role in shutting down USAID. The Trump administration petitioned the Fourth Circuit for a writ of mandamus, and on March 4, 2026, a divided panel granted it 2–1, directing the district court to issue a protective order barring the depositions of Musk and former officials Peter Marocco and Jeremy Lewin. The majority held that the lower court had abused its discretion, as the plaintiffs had not first sought the information through other means.

=== Absorption by the State Department ===
On March 28, 2025, U.S. Secretary of State Marco Rubio notified Congress that USAID would be dissolved and absorbed into the U.S. State Department, stating that USAID had been fiscally irresponsible and strayed from original mission. He argued, "Unfortunately, USAID strayed from its original mission long ago. As a result, the gains were too few and the costs were too high." Since July 1, 2025, USAID's operations have ceased and U.S. foreign assistance has now been administered by the U.S. State Department. In connection with this effort, 83% of USAID programs were cancelled. 94% of staff were laid off.

Representative Jim Himes (D-Conn.), the top Democrat on the House Intelligence Committee, stated as an example of what he viewed as abrupt and irresponsible cost-cutting: “Thanks to DOGE, the men we paid to guard the most vicious ISIS terrorists in the world in Syria walked off the job.”

USAID employees were not automatically transferred. Instead, the State Department is engaging in a “separate and independent hiring process.”

==== Similar situation in UK in 2020 ====
In 2020, Prime Minister Boris Johnson merged UK's Department for International Development with the Foreign Office.

=== Impact of demise ===
The impact of the demise of USAID on global health is wide reaching.

A study published in The Lancet on June 30, 2025, estimated that funding cuts and the abolition of the agency could result in at least 14 million preventable deaths by 2030, 4.5 million of which could be among children under 5 years old. The study concluded that the discontinuation of PEPFAR alone could cause as many as 10.75 million new HIV infections and as many as 2.93 million deaths related to HIV. The study warned that for low and middle income countries, "the resulting shock would be similar in scale to a global pandemic or a major armed conflict."

Another study published in March 2025 concluded that the suspension of PEPFAR could result in HIV-related deaths surging to as high as 630,000 per year. Christine Stegling, deputy executive director at UNAIDS, estimated that there could be a 400% increase in AIDS-related deaths around the world if PEPFAR was not formally reauthorized for USAID funding, which represents around 6.3 million AIDS-related deaths within four years. In 2024, PEPFAR funds accounted for 14% of the entire health budget of Zimbabwe.

In March 2025, experts from the Center for Global Development estimated that before the freeze, USAID programs annually prevented approximately 1,650,000 deaths from HIV/AIDS, 500,000 deaths from lack of vaccines, 310,000 deaths from tuberculosis and 290,000 deaths from malaria.

USAID-funded breast feeding programs to reduce malnutrition in Nepal were brought to a halt following the aid freeze on January 20, 2025.

According to Pio Smith, UNFPA’s Asia-Pacific regional director, the USAID freeze could lead to 1,200 maternal deaths and 109,000 additional unwanted pregnancies in the next three years in Afghanistan.

A USAID info memo written by Nicholas Enrich, Acting Assistant Administrator for Global Health, dated March 4, 2025, outlined the risks of the aid freeze. He stated that a permanent suspension of lifesaving humanitarian aid posed a direct threat to public health, economic stability, national security and biothreat vulnerability. He concluded: "Any decision to halt or significantly reduce global health funding for lifesaving humanitarian assistance (LHA)—despite approved waivers—and USAID global health programming, despite congressional mandates, would have severe domestic and global consequences." Enrich was notified that he was put on administrative leave less than 30 minutes after the memo's publication, a decision that had reportedly been made a week prior.

Pe Kha Lau, 71, died after she was discharged from a USAID-funded healthcare facility operated by the International Rescue Committee (IRC) while still relying on oxygen to survive. In the Umpiem Mai camp in Thailand, witnesses reported the deaths of multiple patients who too relied on oxygen. The IRC offered their condolences to the family and friends of Pe Kha Lau. Nicholas Kristof also documented evidence contradicting Elon Musk's claim that "No one has died as a result of a brief pause to do a sanity check on foreign aid funding. No one." Secretary of State Marco Rubio similarly claimed while testifying before Congress that no death resulted from the shutdown.

Dr. Brooke Nichols, an infectious disease modeler working at Boston University, created an impact counter to estimate the life toll of funding cuts on various USAID health programs. As of 5 July 2025, the counter estimates that over 341,700 deaths have been caused by the funding discontinuation, over 230,700 of which are children.

==== Malaria ====
The President's Malaria Initiative, started with help from George W. Bush, has contributed to a more than 60% reduction in malaria deaths, saved 7.6 million lives, and prevented 1.5 billion malaria cases globally between 2000 and 2019. PMI has supported malaria prevention and control for over 500 million at-risk people in Africa.

However, the USAID funding of PMI has been cut an estimated 47% as of June 2025. In countries such as the Democratic Republic of the Congo (DRC), these funds had supported the supply of antimalarial drugs to numerous health zones, including preventive treatments for pregnant women. Health officials in the DRC reported that the effects of these cuts were already being felt, with increased risk of severe illness and death from malaria among vulnerable populations. Former aid workers and experts also expressed concern that reduced funding undermined disease surveillance systems that help detect malaria and other outbreaks early. Such surveillance not only protects affected countries but also contributes to U.S. health security by limiting the global spread of disease. Aid organizations also highlighted how these cuts create a "vicious cycle," with malnutrition and malaria reinforcing one another. Reductions in U.S. support for nutrition programs increase children's vulnerability to malaria and other diseases, while higher malaria infections can worsen malnutrition.

== Sources ==
- Bingham, Jonathan Brewster (1953). Shirt-Sleeve Diplomacy: Point 4 in Action. John Day & Co.
- Brown, William Adams Jr.; Opie, Redvers (1953). American Foreign Assistance. Washington, DC: The Brookings Institution.
- Butterfield, Samuel Hale (2004). U.S. Development Aid – An Historic First: Achievements and Failures in the Twentieth Century. Westport, CN: Praeger. ISBN 0-313-31910-3.
- Glick, Philip M. (1957). The Administration of Technical Assistance: Growth in the Americas. Chicago: University of Chicago Press.
- Haviland, H. Field (1958). "Foreign Aid and the Policy Process: 1957". The American Political Science Review. 52 (3): 689–724. doi:10.2307/1951900. JSTOR 1951900. S2CID 144564474.
- Hayes, Samuel J., ed. (1971). The Beginnings of American Aid to Southeast Asia: The Griffin Mission of 1950. Lexington, MA: Heath Lexington Books.
- Jolly, Richard; Emmerji, Louis; Ghai, Dharam; Lapeyre, Frederic (2004). UN Contributions to Development Thinking and Practice. Bloomington: Indiana University Press.
- Kaufman, B. Ira (1982). Trade and aid : Eisenhower's foreign economic policy, 1953–1961. Baltimore, MD: Johns Hopkins University Press. p. 82. ISBN 978-0-8018-2623-8.
- Nowels, Larry Q. (February 1987). Economic Security Assistance As a Tool of American Foreign Policy: The Current Dilemma and Future Options (PDF) (Report). National War College. Archived from the original (PDF) on 2017-10-11 – via Development Experience Clearinghouse.
- Ruttan, Vernon W. (1996). United States Development Assistance Policy: The Domestic Politics of Foreign Economic Aid. Johns Hopkins University Press. ISBN 0-8018-5051-7.
