= Pakistan Computer Emergency Response Team =

Pakistani cybersecurity body

National Cyber Emergency Response Team (National CERT) of Pakistan or PKCERT
- Abbreviation: nCERT/PKCERT
- Formation: March 11, 2024
- Type: Government Agency
- Legal status: Active
- Purpose: Cybersecurity
- Location: L-Block, Pak Secretariat, Islamabad, Pakistan.
- Region served: Pakistan
- Director General: Dr. Haider Abbas
- Parent organisation: Cabinet Division ()
- Website: PKCERT Website

National Cyber Emergency Response Team (National CERT) of Pakistan or PKCERT is a national initiative aimed at strengthening cyber security in Pakistan. PKCERT was established to counter the growing cyber threats and hacking attempts targeting various public sector entities.

== History ==
The government of Pakistan announced the formation of the country's first National Cyber Emergency Response Team (CERT) on 11 March 2024. The development was aimed at keeping Pakistan's cyberspace safe from emerging threats and hacking attempts targeting public sector institutions.

The Federal Cabinet of Pakistan approved the Cyber Emergency Response Teams (CERTs) Rule 2023 on 17 July 2023. The Ministry of Information Technology and Telecommunication officially notified the CERT Rules on 13 October 2023.

== Role and responsibilities ==
The primary objective of CERT teams at both the national and sectoral levels is to enhance Pakistan's overall cyber security posture and resilience. CERTs are responsible for protecting against, detecting and responding to cyber security incidents, and will enhance the country's capacity to manage cyber security incidents. The recently established CERT team is assigned to create a national framework that will manage responses to threats, assaults on vital infrastructure, information systems, data, or extensive breaches of information systems throughout Pakistan.

== Founding Director General / Head of Pakistan's CERT ==
Dr. Haider Abbas, an eminent professor from the National University of Sciences and Technology, has been designated as the founding Director General of Pakistan's National Cyber Emergency Response Team.
