= National Agency for Computer Security =

Tunisian national computer security agency

- الوكالة الوطنية للسلامة المعلوماتية

Agency overview
- Formed: 2004
- Headquarters: Mutuelle Ville, Tunis,
- Agency executive: Ali GHRIB, Director General
- Website: www.ansi.tn

The National Agency for Computer Security is the Tunisian national computer security agency. It was founded in 2004 and it is based in Tunis, Tunisia. Its Director General is Ali GHRIB.
