= .cz =

Top-level Internet domain for the Czech Republic

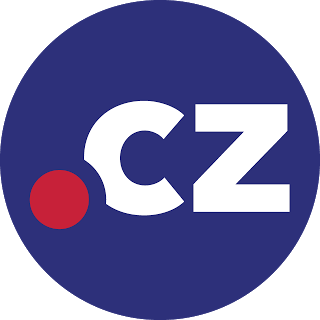
- Introduced: 13 January 1993
- TLD type: Country code top-level domain
- Status: Active
- Registry: CZ.NIC
- Sponsor: CZ.NIC
- Intended use: Entities affiliated with the Czech Republic
- Actual use: Very popular in the Czech Republic
- Registered domains: 1,502,253 (2025-08-08)
- Registration restrictions: Businesses must provide tax registration number
- Structure: Names can be registered directly at second level
- Documents: Rules Juridical verdicts
- Dispute policies: Problems
- DNSSEC: yes
- Registry website: nic.cz

.cz is the country code top-level domain (ccTLD) for the Czech Republic administered by CZ.NIC.

== History ==
Until Czechoslovakia was dissolved in 1993, it used the domain .cs.

The .cz domain came into effect in January 1993, following the dissolution of Czechoslovakia.

In 2009, new European Union legislation came into effect, allowing the use of diacritics in second-level domains under the .eu domain only.

== Registration ==
The .cz domain, operated by the CZ.NIC association, continued to only offer standard characters, citing insufficient demand and lower accessibility from abroad as reasons behind their decision.

Czech customers were among the most interested in the new domains, only Germans bought more, with the French in third.

Over 850,000 internet sites had been registered as .cz by the end of 2011.

In 2012, the number exceeded one million. The Czech Republic was therefore the 12th European Union member state with a top-level domain to top a million active domain names.

At the end of 2011, CZ.NIC reported that ownership of all domains, 58% were by individuals, whereas those held by organisations accounted for a minority of 42%. Domains were most popular in Prague, followed by Brno and Ostrava.

=== Requirements ===
Registrations must be ordered via accredited domain name registrars.

The maximum domain name length permitted is 63 characters, which may only be alphanumeric or the hyphen (-).

Hyphens are restricted in that they may not be the first or last character, neither may they appear consecutively.

As of 2013, there are six domains which use the maximum of 63 characters.
