= TR-CERT =

Computer Emergency Response Team of Turkey (TR-CERT)
- Ulusal Siber Olaylara Müdahale Merkezi (USOM)
- Logo of TR-CERT

Agency overview
- Formed: 27 May 2013
- Type: National computer emergency response team (CERT)
- Jurisdiction: Republic of Turkey
- Headquarters: Çankaya, Ankara
- Parent agency: Information and Communication Technologies Authority
- Website: https://www.usom.gov.tr/

TR-CERT (Computer Emergency Response Team of the Republic of Turkey, Turkish: Ulusal Siber Olaylara Müdahale Merkezi (USOM)) is an organization within the Information and Communication Technologies Authority (ICTA) which is the national regulatory authority of the Turkish electronic communication sector. It is responsible for the analysis and risk mitigation of large-scale cyber threats and vulnerabilities, communicating information regarding malicious cyber activities or possible vulnerabilities to computer security incident response teams (CSIRT) and the public.

== Background ==
TR-CERT was established on 27 May 2013 within the ICTA, in accordance with the 4. clause "National Cybersecurity Strategy and 2013-2014 Action Plan" (Turkish: Ulusal Siber Güvenlik Stratejisi ve 2013-2014 Eylem Planı) issued by the Cabinet of Turkey and published in the Official Gazette of the Republic of Turkey.

== Mission ==
The mission of TR-CERT is to protect the Turkish government's and its citizens' cyberspace, taking measures for the protection of critical infrastructures, both public and private, such as energy production and distribution, water management, and telecommunication institutions and facilities in Turkey. TR-CERT also takes both proactive and reactive actions toward cyber incidents that would affect the country as a whole, such as botnets, malware, and distributed denial-of-service (DDoS) attacks.

There are over 1300 CSIRTs and over 4000 cyber security professionals in nearly every sector in Turkey that coordinate with TR-CERT regarding cyber incidents. These CSIRTs are mostly institutional CSIRTs (such as the CSIRT of a bank), but there are also industry-specific CSIRTs that coordinate with TR-CERT (such as the CSIRT of the finance industry).

== Activities ==
The Cyber Star (Turkish: Siber Yıldız), a 24-hour online capture-the-flag cybersecurity competition organized by TR-CERT, had over 20,000 contestants working either in teams or individually, during the latest competition held in February 2019. In the previous Cyber Star event held in January 2017, TR-CERT had nearly 15,000 contestants and some of the most successful contestants were hired by TR-CERT later on.

In December 2019, TR-CERT organized the "Cyber Shield 2019", an international cybersecurity exercise with simulated cyber attacks, malware, phishing, and industrial control systems (ICS). Held at the ICTA headquarters in Ankara, contestants from 17 countries competed to identify cybersecurity emergencies and take the necessary measures within the scenarios and technical infrastructure prepared by TR-CERT. The exercise was supported by the International Telecommunication Union (ITU) agency of the United Nations and the Cybersecurity Alliance for Mutual Progress (CAMP). International Cyber Shield 2019 was organized to increase preparedness to combat cybersecurity incidents and foster international cooperation in dealing with them.

On 10 February 2020, TR-CERT's security operations center (SOC) was officially opened, with the attendance of the President of Turkey, Recep Tayyip Erdoğan. Speaking at the opening ceremony, Recep Tayyip Erdoğan said

"We aim for Turkey to not only be a consumer of technology, but also be a country that designs, develops, produces, and markets technologies to the world. The security dimension of digital transformation is at least as important as the physical defense of countries."

Cooperating with "ICTA Academy" (Turkish: BTK Akademi), TR-CERT has given various cybersecurity trainings, ranging from web application security to computer forensics. Similarly, TR-CERT gives one-on-one, hands-on training to cybersecurity enthusiasts in the Fetih Cyber Drill Field

Some of the other events organized and/or attended by TR-CERT include:

- TR-CERT - CSIRT Advisory Meetings
- Energy Sector CSIRTs Meeting
- NATO CMX-2017 and CMX-2019 Crisis Management Exercises

Due to TR-CERT's contribution to the cybersecurity ecosystem in Turkey, between the years 2017 and 2018, the ranking of Turkey on the Global Cybersecurity Index (GTI) published by ITU went up by 23 ranks, going from 43 to 20 within a year.

TR-CERT is accredited by Trusted Introducer and also is a member of the Forum of Incident Response and Security Teams (FIRST) and the Organisation of Islamic Cooperation's (OIC) computer emergency response team, OIC-CERT.
