= National Security Authority (Czech Republic) =

- Národní bezpečnostní úřad
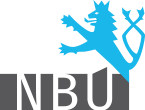

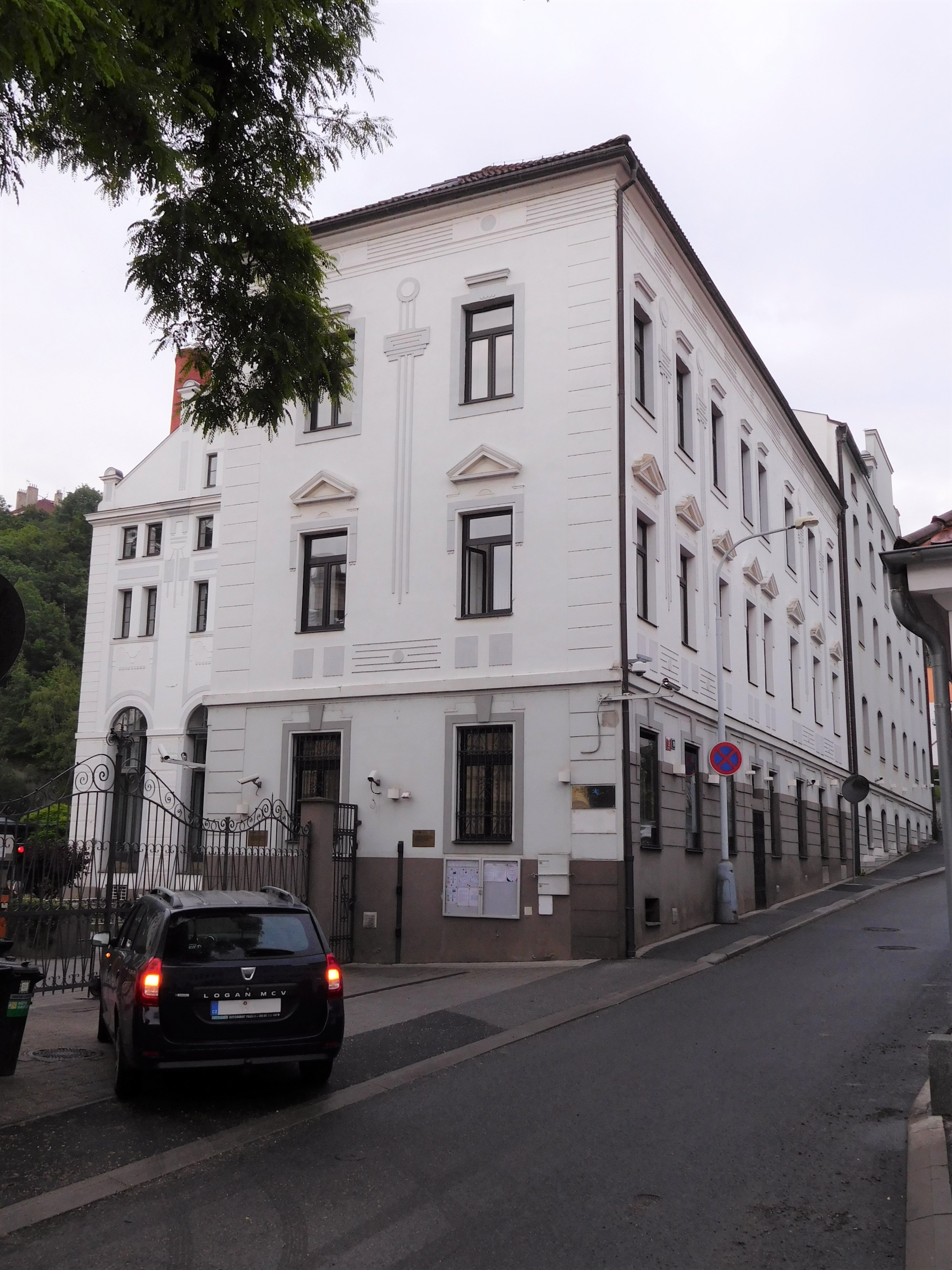
- Main building

Agency overview
- Formed: 1998
- Headquarters: Prague, Czech Republic; 50°4′11.26″N 14°23′6.14″E
- Agency executive: Jiří Lang, Director
- Website: www.nbu.cz

National Security Authority (Czech: Národní bezpečnostní úřad, NBÚ) is a Czech government agency responsible for maintaining security clearances, protection of classified information and cyber security of the Czech Republic. NBÚ is also charged with protection of the Czech government communications and information systems against penetration and network warfare.
