= Simple DNS Plus =

- Developer(s): JH Software
- Stable release: 9.1 / 28 October 2021
- Operating system: Microsoft Windows
- Available in: English
- Type: DNS server
- License: proprietary
- Website: www.simpledns.plus

== Overview ==
Simple DNS Plus is a DNS server software product that runs on x86 and x64 editions of Windows operating system.

All options and settings are available directly from a Windows user interface. It provides wizards for common tasks such as setting up new zones, importing data, making bulk updates, etc.

It has full support for IPv6. It has an option to control protocol preference (IPv4 / IPv6) on dual-stack computers, and it can even act as IPv6-to-IPv4 or IPv4-to-IPv6 forwarder.

It has full support for internationalized domain names (IDNs). You can enter domain names with native characters directly (no punycode conversion needed), and have an option to display native character or punycoded domain names anywhere in the user interface, and quickly switch between these modes.

You can create DNS records or entire zone files from other applications or web-sites and prompt Simple DNS Plus to dynamically load and use this through command line options, a simple HTTP API, and a full .NET/COM programming API.

Simple DNS Plus is based on the Microsoft .NET Framework 4.8 and is 100% managed code, protecting it from common security issues such as buffer overruns, and making it run natively on both 32 bit and 64 bit CPUs and Windows versions, including Windows Vista.

== History / Versions ==
Version numbers, date released, and new feature highlights

=== Version 1.00 - 3 June 1999 ===
- First official release

=== Version 2.00 - 10 December 1999 ===
- Binding to specific local IP addresses
- Limit recursion to one or more IP address ranges
- IP address blocking
- Support for AAAA and SRV records
- Run as NT/Windows service
- Reverse zone wizard
- Wildcard records
- Standard zone transfers
- Cache snapshot viewer

=== Version 3.00 - 24 August 2000 ===
- Import wizard
- Zone file sharing
- Support for HINFO, MB, MG, MINFO, MR AFSDB, ISDN, RP, RT, X25, NSAP, and ATMA records
- Standard Zone files compatible with BIND
- Command line options

=== Version 3.20 - 2 April 2001 ===
- Super Master/Slave
- HTTP API
- Dynamic updates
- Incremental zone transfers
- Support for A6, DNAME records

=== Version 3.50 - 3 October 2003 ===
- Separation of service and GUI
- NXDOMAIN redirect
- Support for LOC, NAPTR records

=== Version 3.60 - 27 June 2004 ===
- TSIG signed dynamic updates
- Domain specific forwarding
- Stealth DNS

=== Version 4.00 - 10 April 2005 ===
- Automatic SPF records
- NAT IP Alias
- Record and zone comments
- Bulk update wizard
- Zone groups

=== Version 5.0 - 17 January 2008 ===
Version 5.0 was re-written for the .NET Framework 2.0

- Windows Vista / Windows Server 2008 support
- IPv6 support
- IDN support
- Plug-in system
- Quick Zone Templates
- Support for RFC 2671, RFC 3597, RFC 4408

=== Version 5.1 - 8 July 2008 ===
- Suspending zones
- Remote logging to syslog server
- Response Filtering to prevent DNS rebinding attacks
- Support for RFC 3164, RFC 5452

=== Version 5.2 - 23 April 2009 ===
- Windows 7 / Windows server core support
- Remote Management
- DNSSEC hosting
- Secure Zone Transfers (TSIG signed)
- Check Internet Delegations wizard
- Windows Performance Counters
- DNS request "rules" for plug-ins
- RFC 3225, RFC 4033, RFC 4034, RFC 4035, RFC 4635, RFC 4641, RFC 4701, RFC 5155

=== Version 5.3 - 27 October 2015 ===
- ALIAS-records (Auto Resolved Alias)
- DNS0x20
- HTTP API can share port 80 / domain / partial URL with IIS
- New authentication options for HTTP API
- CERT-records (Certificate / CRL)
- TLSA-records (Transport Layer Security Authentication)

=== Version 6.0 - 20 April 2016 ===
- Zone version control
- All DNS data and program settings in single database file
- View/Save as standard zone file
- Export standard boot file and zone files
- SHA-256 and SHA-512 in DNSSEC signatures
- SHA-256 and SHA-384 hashes in DNSSEC DS-records
- CAA-records (Certification Authority Authorization)

=== Version 7.0 - 19 May 2018 ===
- New HTTP API (v. 2)
- HTTP API - CORS support
- HTTP API - SSL support
- HTTP API - debugging log files
- New zone account-ID setting
- Import zones from a Simple DNS Plus v. 6.0 / 7.x database file
- Enhanced auto IP address blocking

=== Version 8.0 - 2 July 2018 ===
- Automatic DNSSEC signing
- Automatic DNSSEC ZSK rollover
- On-line DNSSEC keys
- Scheduled automatic deletion of on-line DNSSEC keys
- Combining on-line and off-line DNSSEC keys
- New function to remove/disable DNSSEC for a zone
- DNSSEC records hidden in GUI
- New HTTP API commands for DNSSEC

=== Version 9.0 - 28 September 2021 ===
- DNS over TLS (DoT) and DNS over HTTPS (DoH)
- New "Bind SSL certificate" helper function
- "HTTPS" DNS record type

=== Version 9.1 - 28 October 2021 ===
- JavaScript plug-in
- New asynchronous plug-in interface
- Plug-in query order enhanced

== See also ==
- Comparison of DNS server software
