= Comparison of DNS server software =

This article presents a comparison of the features, platform support, and packaging of many independent implementations of Domain Name System (DNS) name server software.

== Servers compared ==
Each of these DNS servers is an independent implementation of the DNS protocols, capable of resolving DNS names for other computers, publishing the DNS names of computers, or both. Excluded from consideration are single-feature DNS tools (such as proxies, filters, and firewalls) and redistributions of servers listed here (many products repackage BIND, for instance, with proprietary user interfaces).

DNS servers are grouped into several categories of specialization of servicing domain name system queries. The two principal roles, which may be implemented either uniquely or combined in a given product are:

- Authoritative server: authoritative name servers publish DNS mappings for domains under their authoritative control. Typically, a company (e.g. "Acme Example Widgets") would provide its own authority services to respond to address queries, or for other DNS information, for www.example.int. These servers are listed as being at the top of the authority chain for their respective domains, and are capable of providing a definitive answer. Authoritative name servers can be primary name servers, also known as master servers, i.e. they contain the original set of data, or they can be secondary or slave name servers, containing data copies usually obtained from synchronization directly with the primary server, either via a DNS mechanism, or by other data store synchronization mechanisms.
- Recursive server: recursive servers (sometimes called "DNS caches", "caching-only name servers") provide DNS name resolution for applications, by relaying the requests of the client application to the chain of authoritative name servers to fully resolve a network name. They also (typically) cache the result to answer potential future queries within a certain expiration (time-to-live) period. Most Internet users access a recursive server provided by their internet service provider to locate internet hosts such as www.example.com.

=== BIG-IP DNS ===
F5 Networks BIG-IP product line offers DNS as an authoritative or recursive server and adds additional security measures. Key advantage is to use the same application delivery controller to support DNS and application acceleration.

=== BIND ===
BIND is the de facto standard DNS server. It is a free software product and is distributed with most Unix and Linux platforms, where it is most often also referred to as named (name daemon). In 2004, it was the most widely deployed DNS server. Historically, BIND underwent three major revisions, each with significantly different architectures: BIND4, BIND8, and BIND9. BIND4 and BIND8 are now technically obsolete and not considered in this article. BIND9 is a ground-up rewrite of BIND featuring complete DNSSEC support in addition to other features and enhancements.

Internet Systems Consortium started development of a new version, BIND 10. Its first release was in April 2010, but ISC involvement concluded with the release of BIND 10 version 1.2 in April 2014. ISC cited a lack of resources to continue development of BIND 10, and they reaffirmed their commitment to BIND9.

The BIND 10 codebase continues on as an open source project. It is not included in this comparison at this time.

=== Cisco Network Registrar ===
CNR includes a commercial DNS server from Cisco Systems usually used in conjunction with the CNR DHCP (Dynamic Host Configuration Protocol) server. It supports high rates of dynamic update.

=== CoreDNS ===
CoreDNS is the recommended DNS server for Kubernetes. The associated project was lifted to "graduated" maturity status by the CNCF in 2019.

=== Dnsmasq ===
Dnsmasq is a lightweight, easy to configure DNS forwarder, designed to provide DNS (and optionally DHCP and TFTP) services to a small-scale network. It can serve the names of local machines which are not in the global DNS.

Dnsmasq accepts DNS queries and either answers them from a small, local cache or forwards them to a real, recursive DNS server. It loads the contents of /etc/hosts, so that local host names which do not appear in the global DNS can be resolved.

=== djbdns ===
Djbdns is a collection of DNS applications, including tinydns, which was the second most used free software DNS server in 2004. It was designed by Daniel J. Bernstein, author of qmail, with an emphasis on security considerations. In March 2009, Bernstein paid $1000 to the first person finding a security hole in djbdns. The source code is not centrally maintained and was released into the public domain in 2007. There are multiple forks and more than a dozen patches to add additional features to djbdns.

=== gdnsd ===
gdnsd is a DNS server designed for geographic balancing. gdnsd is the DNS server used by Wikipedia for its servers and networking.

=== Knot DNS ===
Knot DNS is a free software authoritative DNS server by CZ.NIC. Knot DNS aims to be a fast, resilient DNS server usable for infrastructure (root and TLD) and DNS hosting services. Knot DNS supports DNSSEC signing and among others hosts root zone (B, K, and L root name servers), several top-level domains.

=== Knot Resolver ===
Knot Resolver is an open source modern resolver implementation designed for scalability, resiliency, and flexibility. Its core architecture is tiny and efficient, and most of the rich features are implemented as optional modules, which limits attack surface and improves performance. Many resolver features are available out-of-the-box as modules while keeping core tiny and efficient. Modular architecture provides a state-machine like API for extensions, such as C and Lua modules.

=== MaraDNS ===
MaraDNS is a free software DNS server by Sam Trenholme that claims a good security history and ease of use. In order to change any DNS records, MaraDNS needs to be restarted. Like djbdns dnscache, the MaraDNS 2.0 stand-alone recursive resolver ("Deadwood") does not use threads.

=== Microsoft DNS ===
Windows DNS Server component of Microsoft DNS. The same software can be configured to support authoritative, recursive and hybrid mode. The software is integrated with Active Directory which makes it the default DNS software for many enterprise networks that are based on Active Directory. It also allows creating zones by the standard DNS zone file. The software comes packaged as a role in Windows Server. The server software is shipped with a command line application dnscmd, a DNS management GUI wizard, and a DNS PowerShell package. In Windows Server 2012, the Windows DNS added support for DNSSEC, with full-fledged online signing, with Dynamic DNS and NSEC3 support, along with RSASHA and ECDSA signing algorithms. It provides an inbuilt key storage provider and support for any third party CNG compliant key storage provider. User interface and PowerShell support for managing DNS and DNSSEC were improved as well. In the Windows Server 2016, the DNS Server supports DNS policies using which the admins can have more control over the name resolution process.

=== NSD ===
NSD is a free software authoritative server provided by NLNet Labs. NSD is a test-bed server for DNSSEC; new DNSSEC protocol features are often prototyped using the NSD code base. NSD hosts several top-level domains, and operates three of the root nameservers.

=== pdnsd ===
Pdnsd is a caching DNS proxy server that stores cached DNS records on disk for long term retention. Pdnsd is designed to be highly adaptable to situations where net connectivity is slow, unreliable, unavailable, or highly dynamic, with limited capability of acting as an authoritative nameserver. It is licensed under the GPL.

=== Posadis ===
Posadis is a free software DNS server, written in C++, featuring Dynamic DNS update support.

=== PowerDNS ===
PowerDNS is a free software DNS server with a variety of data storage back-ends and load balancing features. Authoritative and recursive server functions are implemented as separate applications, as well as a separate DNS caching proxy (dnsdist) which implements features such as DNS over HTTPS.

=== Secure64 DNS ===
DNS Authority is commercial authoritative name server software from Secure64, the company that built Genuinely Secure DNS applications and operating system and completely automated the deployment of DNSSEC.

DNS Cache is scalable, highly secure recursive DNS software from Secure64 which provides built-in protection against high-volume denial of service attacks, including Pseudo Random Sub Domain (PRSD) attacks.

=== Simple DNS Plus ===
Simple DNS Plus is a commercial DNS server product that runs under Microsoft Windows with an emphasis on a simple-to-use GUI. Maintenance of the software appears to have slackened in recent years.

=== Technitium DNS Server ===
Technitium DNS Server is a free, opensource (GPLv3), cross platform, authoritative, caching and recursive DNS server software. It supports DNS-over-TLS, DNS-over-HTTPS, and DNS-over-QUIC encrypted DNS protocols. It also supports DNSSEC signing and validation for RSA and ECDSA algorithms with both NSEC and NSEC3.

The DNS server also features blocking domain names using block lists and also supports using HTTP or SOCKS5, for transport of DNS requests over Tor network.

The DNS server supports running independently developed plugins that can be used to process and respond to DNS requests. It also provides a HTTP API that can be used by 3rd party software to manage the DNS server.

=== Unbound ===
Unbound is a validating, recursive and caching DNS server designed for high performance. It was released on May 20, 2008 (version 1.0.0) as free software licensed under the BSD license by NLnet Labs. It is installed as part of the base system in FreeBSD starting with version 10.0, and in NetBSD with version 8.0. A version is also available in OpenBSD version 5.6 and beyond. (Previous versions of FreeBSD shipped with BIND.)

=== YADIFA ===
YADIFA is a BSD-licensed, memory-efficient DNS server written in C. The acronym YADIFA stands for Yet Another DNS Implementation For All. It was created by EURid, which operates the .eu top-level domain.

== Features ==
Some DNS features are relevant only to recursive servers, or to authoritative servers. As a result, a feature matrix such as the one in this article cannot by itself represent the effectiveness or maturity of a given implementation.

Another important qualifier is the server architecture. Some DNS servers provide support for both server roles in a single, "monolithic" program. Others are divided into smaller programs, each implementing a subsystem of the server. As in the classic Computer Science microkernel debate, the importance and utility of this distinction is hotly debated. The feature matrix in this article does not discuss whether DNS features are provided in a single program or several, so long as those features are provided with the base server package and not with third-party add-on software.

=== Explanation of features ===
Authoritative
A major category of DNS server functionality, see above.

Recursive
A major category of DNS server functionality, see above.

Recursion Access Control
Servers with this feature provide control over which hosts are permitted DNS recursive lookups. This is useful for load balancing and service protection.

Secondary Mode (or Slave Mode)
Authoritative servers can publish content that originates from primary data storage (such as zone files or databases connected to business administration processes)--sometimes also called 'master' servers--or can be secondary (or slave) servers, republishing content fetched from and synchronized with such primary servers. Servers with a "secondary mode" feature have a built-in capability to retrieve and republish content from other servers. This is typically, though not always, provided using the AXFR DNS protocol.

Caching
Servers with this feature provide recursive services for applications, and cache the results so that future requests for the same name can be answered quickly, without a full DNS lookup. This is an important performance feature, as it significantly reduces the latency of DNS requests.

DNSSEC
Servers with this feature implement some variant of the DNSSEC protocols. They may publish names with resource record signatures (providing a "secure authority service"), and may validate those signatures during recursive lookups (providing a "secure resolver"). DNSSEC is becoming more widespread as the deployment of a DNSSEC root key has been done by ICANN. Deployment to individual sites is growing as top level domains start to deploy DNSSEC too. The presence of DNSSEC features is a notable characteristic of a DNS server.

TSIG
Servers with this feature typically provide DNSSEC services. In addition, they support the TSIG (Transaction SIGnature) protocol, which allows DNS clients to establish a secure session with the server to publish Dynamic DNS records or to request secure DNS lookups without incurring the cost and complexity of full DNSSEC support.

IPv6
Servers with this feature are capable of publishing or handling DNS records that refer to IPv6 addresses. In addition to be fully IPv6 capable they must implement IPv6 transport protocol for queries and zone transfers in secondary/primary relationships and forwarder functions.

Wildcard
Servers with this feature can publish information for wildcard records, which provide data about DNS names in DNS zones that are not specifically listed in the zone.

Split horizon
Servers with the split-horizon DNS feature can give different answers depending on the source IP address of the query.

=== Feature matrix ===
Server	Authoritative	Recursive	Recursion ACL	Secondary mode	Caching	DNSSEC	TSIG	IPv6	Wildcard	Free Software	Interface	split horizon	DNS over HTTPS	DNS over QUIC
BIG-IP DNS	Yes	Yes	Yes	Yes	Yes	Yes	Yes	Yes	Yes	No	API, command line	Yes	Yes	No
BIND	Yes	Yes	Yes	Yes	Yes	Yes	Yes	Yes (since 9.x)	Yes (since 4.x)	Yes	Web (Note: A BIND configuration module is available for Webmin in many Linux distributions.), command line	Yes	Yes	No (Note: BIND does not support DoQ yet)
PowerDNS	Yes	Yes	Yes	Yes (Note: IPv6 primary/secondary support in PowerDNS is incomplete in versions <3.0. Zone transfers in primary/secondary replication over IPv6 is supported since 3.0.)	Yes	Yes (since 3.0) (Note: Full DNSSEC support in PowerDNS arrived in version 3.0. In lower versions, it is currently restricted to being able to serve DNSSEC-related RRs.)	Yes (since 3.0)	Yes	Yes	Yes	REST, Web (Note: Powerdns.com suggested enhancements at), command line	Yes (since 5.0) (Note: Views - PowerDNS Authoritative Server documentation)	Yes (in dnsdist)	Yes (Note: PowerDNS DNSdist 1.9.0.)
CoreDNS	Yes	Partial via proxying	Yes	Yes	Yes	Yes	Yes	Yes	Yes	Yes	API	Yes	Yes	Yes (since 1.11) (Note: Coredns 1.11.0)
djbdns	Yes	Yes	Yes	Yes (Note: djbdns provides facilities to transfer zones; after completing the zone transfer, djbdns can act as an authoritative server for that zone. Consult the axfr-get documentation for further information.)	Yes	Partial (Note: A patch for publishing authoritative DNSSEC-protected data is available at .)	No	Partial via generic records.	Partial (Note: djbdns supports wildcard DNS records, but not in a way that conforms with the RFCs.)	Yes	command line and web (VegaDNS & NicTool)	Yes (Note: This is not the same as views in bind. But it is a solution with comparable capabilities. See: section of tinydns-data.)	No	No
dbndns	Yes	Yes	Yes	Yes	Yes	No	No	Yes	Partial	Yes	command line and web	Yes	No	No
pdnsd	Partial	Yes	Partial	Partial	Yes	No	Partial	Yes	Yes	Yes	command line, pdnsd-ctl program	Partial	No	No
MaraDNS	Yes	Yes	Yes	Partial (Note: MaraDNS cannot directly provide secondary support. Instead, a zone transfer is needed, after which MaraDNS will act as an authoritative server for that zone. See DNS Slave for further information.)	Yes	No	No	Partial	Yes	Yes	command line	No	No	No
Posadis	Yes	Yes	Yes	Yes	Yes	No	No	Yes	Yes	Yes	command line, API	No	No	No
Unbound	Partial	Yes	Yes	—N/a	Yes	Yes	No	Yes	Yes	Yes	command line, API	Yes	Yes	Partial
Dnsmasq	Partial (Note: dnsmasq has limited authoritative support, intended for internal network use rather than public Internet use. A records are supported via /etc/hosts, and there is some MX, TXT and SRV record support via the command line.)	No	No	No	Yes	Yes (since 2.69) (Note: DNSSEC validation was added in Dnsmasq version 2.69 . Earlier versions could only pass through validation results from their own upstream nameservers.)	No	Yes	Yes	Yes	command line	Partial (Note: Dnsmasq can do basic split-horizon DNS based on the interface of the source request using the localise-queries configuration parameter.)		No
NSD	Yes	No	—N/a	Yes	—N/a	Yes	Yes	Yes	Yes	Yes	command line	No		No
Knot DNS	Yes	No	—N/a	Yes	—N/a	Yes	Yes	Yes	Yes	Yes	command line	Yes (Note: Knot DNS provides query source address based responses via its geoip and queryacl modules.)		Yes (Note: Knot DNS Version 3.3.0)
Knot Resolver	No	Yes	Yes	—N/a	Yes	Yes	No (Note: As of v5.5.2 This just selects rule based on the key name, it doesn’t verify the key or signature yet.)	Yes	No	Yes	cli / socket	No (Note: Setups like split-horizon which depend on isolated DNS caches are explicitly not supported. https://knot-resolver.readthedocs.io/en/v5.5.2/modules-view.html)	Yes	No
YADIFA	Yes	No	—N/a	Yes	—N/a	Yes	Yes	Yes	Yes	Yes	command line	No	No	No
Microsoft DNS	Yes	Yes	Yes (Note: In Windows Server technical Preview (2016), you can create DNS policies to control how a DNS Server handles DNS queries based on different parameters. This supports Recursion control, location aware responses, split-brain deployment, filters etc. configuration parameter.)	Yes	Yes	Yes (Note: Windows Server 2008 R2 supports DNSSEC, however dynamic DNS is not supported for DNSSEC-signed zones. It is fully supported in Windows Server 2012. For earlier versions, including Windows Server 2003, DNSSEC functionality must be manually activated in the registry Archived 2008-03-25 at the Wayback Machine. In these versions, the DNSSEC support is sufficient to act as a slave/secondary server for a signed zone, but not sufficient to create a signed zone (lack of key generation and signing utilities).)	Yes (Note: Microsoft DNS supports the GSS-TSIG algorithm for Secure Dynamic Update when integrated with Active Directory, using RFC 3645, an application of GSS-API RFC 2743.)	Yes (Note: IPv6 functionality in the Microsoft DNS server is only available on Windows Server 2003 and newer.)	Yes	No	GUI, command line, API, WMI, RPC (Note: MS-DNSP DNS Server Management Protocol Specification (uses RPCs))	Yes		No
Simple DNS Plus	Yes	Yes	Yes	Yes	Yes	Yes	Yes	Yes	Yes	No	GUI, Web, command line	Yes (Note: Simple DNS Plus does not have "views" in the same way as BIND, but has a "NAT IP Alias" feature which allows host records to resolve to different IP addresses depending on where the DNS request comes from.)	Yes	No
Secure64 DNS Authority	Yes	No	No	Yes	No	Yes	Yes	Yes	Yes	No	Command Line or Web GUI	Yes		No
Secure64 DNS Cache	No	Yes	Yes	No	Yes	Yes	No	Yes	Yes	No	Command Line or Web GUI	Yes		No
Technitium DNS Server	Yes	Yes	Yes	Yes	Yes	Yes	Yes	Yes	Yes	Yes	Web GUI or HTTP API	Yes	Yes	Yes
Server	Authoritative	Recursive	Recursion ACL	Secondary mode	Caching	DNSSEC	TSIG	IPv6	Wildcard	Free Software	Interface	split horizon	DNS over HTTPS	DNS over QUIC

== Platforms ==
In this overview of operating system support for the discussed DNS server, the following terms indicate the level of support:

- No indicates that it does not exist or was never released.
- Partial indicates that while it works, the server lacks important functionality compared to versions for other OSs; it is still being developed however.
- Beta indicates that while a version is fully functional and has been released, it is still in development (e.g. for stability).
- Yes indicates that it has been officially released in a fully functional, stable version.
- Included indicates that the server comes pre-packaged with or has been integrated into the operating system.

This compilation is not exhaustive, but rather reflects the most common platforms today.

Server	BSD	Solaris	Linux	Mac OS X	Windows
BIND	Yes	Yes	Yes	Yes	Partial (Note: BIND is available for Windows NT-based systems by ftp (including Windows 2000, XP, and Server 2003) in a port (in contrib directory) known as ntbind (from version 9.3.3 Windows builds are present).) (Note: Support for compiling and running BIND 9 natively on Windows has been completely removed as of 9.18.0.)
Microsoft DNS	No	No	No	No	Included (Note: The functionality available with the Microsoft DNS server varies depending on the version of the underlying operating system; such as most Windows Server components, it is upgraded only with the rest of the operating system. Certain functionality, such as DNSSEC and IPv6 support, is only available in the Windows Server 2000-2003 version. Windows 2000 Server includes TSIG support. The Microsoft DNS Server is not available on Windows client operating systems such as Windows XP.)
djbdns	Yes	Yes	Yes	Yes	No
Dnsmasq	Yes	Yes	Yes	Yes	No
Simple DNS Plus	No	No	No	No	Yes
NSD	Yes	Yes	Yes	Yes	No
Knot DNS	Yes	No	Yes	Yes	No
Knot Resolver	Yes	?	Yes	Yes	?
PowerDNS	Yes	Yes	Yes	Beta	No
MaraDNS	Yes	Yes	Yes	Yes	Partial
pdnsd	Yes	Partial	Yes	Yes	No
Posadis	Yes	Yes	Yes	Yes	Yes
Unbound	Yes	Yes	Yes	Yes	Yes
Cisco Network Registrar	No	Yes	Yes	No	Yes
YADIFA	Yes	Yes	Yes	Yes	No
Secure64 DNS Authority	No	No	Yes	No	No
Secure64 DNS Cache	No	No	Yes	No	No
Technitium DNS Server	No	No	Yes	Yes	Yes

== Packaging ==
Server	Creator	Cost (USD)	Public source code	Software license
BIND	Internet Systems Consortium	Free	Yes	BSD, MPL 2.0 for 9.11+
Microsoft DNS	Microsoft	Included with Windows Server	No	Clickwrap license
djbdns	Daniel J. Bernstein	Free	Yes	Public domain
Dnsmasq	Simon Kelley	Free	Yes	GPL
Simple DNS Plus	JH Software	$79 – $379	No	Clickwrap license
NSD	NLnet Labs	Free	Yes	BSD variant
Knot DNS	CZ.NIC	Free	Yes	GPL
Knot Resolver	CZ.NIC	Free	Yes	GPL
PowerDNS	PowerDNS.COM BV / Bert Hubert	Free	Yes	GPL
MaraDNS	Sam Trenholme	Free	Yes	BSD variant
pdnsd	Thomas Moestl and Paul Rombouts	Free	Yes	GPL
Posadis	Meilof Veeningen	Free	Yes	GPL
Unbound	NLnet Labs	Free	Yes	BSD
YADIFA	EURid	Free	Yes	BSD
Secure64 DNS Authority	Secure64	Unpublished price	No	Clickwrap license
Secure64 DNS Cache	Secure64	Unpublished price	No	Clickwrap license
Technitium DNS Server	Technitium	Free	Yes	GPL

== See also ==
- Comparison of DHCP server software
- DNS management software
- Public recursive name server
