= Cisco Network Registrar =

CNR
- Developer(s): Cisco Systems
- Stable release: 7.2 (CNR); 9.0 (CPNR) / December 2016; 8 years ago
- Operating system: Red Hat Enterprise Linux/CentOS, Windows Server 2008 R2, Solaris (operating system), VMware ESX virtual appliance
- Type: DHCP Server, DNS server
- License: Proprietary
- Website: www.cisco.com/c/en/us/products/cloud-systems-management/prime-network-registrar/index.html

Cisco Prime Network Registrar (CNR) is a Cisco software product that includes components for Domain Name System (DNS) services, Dynamic Host Configuration Protocol services, Trivial File Transfer Protocol (TFTP) services, and Simple Network Management Protocol functions. CNR provides a regional and local management structure and is supported on server hardware and software based on 32-bit and 64-bit architectures. This product is now called Cisco Prime Network Registrar.

== DHCP server ==
CNR is a DHCP/DHCPv6 server used by cable-based and similar network service providers because of its support for fail-over between redundant servers, Dynamic DNS updates so that DHCP leases are reflected in DNS data, integration with directory services using LDAP Version 3, and ability to handle high request rates. It is also extensible.

== DNS server ==
The DNS Server in CNR 7.1 provides both authoritative and recursive service, supports incremental zone transfer, notify, and dynamic update, and can service IPv6 requests but does not originate IPv6 requests. It supports TSIG authentication of zone transfers and update but does not support the data origination authentication features of DNSSEC.

== Regional and local management ==
CNR provides for a "regional" cluster of servers and, optionally, up to 100 local clusters of servers. Overall service can be centrally controlled and managed but, in case of communications failure between the regional and local clusters, local clusters can still provide service to clients and can be locally managed. Fine grained administrative roles and privileges can be configured at both the regional level and at local clusters. The management and configuration of CNR are provided by both a command line and web interface. There are also facilities for pushing data (DNS zones, etc.) and configuration from the regional cluster to the local clusters and pulling data and configuration from local clusters to the regional cluster.

== History ==
CNR was originally the Network Registrar product of American Internet Corporation. American Internet was based in the United States with about 50 employees. It was acquired by Cisco Systems in early 1999 under a definitive agreement signed August 21, 1998.

== See also ==
- Comparison of DNS server software
- Cisco Prime
