= Pdns =

Pdns or PDNS may refer to:

- PowerDNS, a DNS server
- Porcine dermatitis nephropathy syndrome, a circovirus associated disease
- Protective DNS, see Nominet UK § Non-core activities
- Primary Domain Name System server

== See also ==
- pdnsd, a caching DNS proxy server
- PDN (disambiguation)
