= Pdnsd =

Caching DNS proxy server

pdnsd
- Original author(s): Thomas Moestl
- Developer(s): Paul Rombouts
- Initial release: January 15, 2002; 23 years ago
- Stable release: 1.2.9a-par / March 17, 2012; 13 years ago
- Repository: https://gitorious.org/pdnsd/pdnsd
- Written in: C
- Operating system: Unix-like
- Type: DNS proxy server
- License: GNU General Public License, version 3 (or any later version)
- Website: members.home.nl/p.a.rombouts/pdnsd/

pdnsd is a caching DNS proxy server created originally by Thomas Moestl and currently maintained by Paul Rombouts.

pdnsd is configurable by a config file or using the program pdns-ctl that comes with the package. Unlike BIND, pdnsd stores cached DNS records on disk for long term retention and will not purge the cache upon program startup or shutdown. pdnsd is designed to be highly adaptable to situations where net connectivity is slow, unreliable, unavailable, or highly dynamic, as is the case with Wi-Fi hotspots or dialup internet. This program also has limited capability of acting as an authoritative nameserver for a local DNS zone within a private network.

The program is released under the GNU General Public License (GPL).

== See also ==
- Comparison of DNS server software
- dbndns
- Unbound (DNS Server)
