= TKEY record =

Record type of the Domain Name System

TKEY (transaction key) is a record type of the Domain Name System (DNS). TKEY resource records (RRs) can be used in a number of different modes to establish shared keys between a DNS resolver and name server.

== TKEY record format ==
TKEY resource record fields
Field	Description	Length (octets)
NAME	Key name, which must be unique on client and server	Variable
TYPE	TKEY (249)	2
CLASS	Ignored, should be ANY (255)	2
TTL	Ignored, should be 0	4
RDLENGTH	Length of RDATA field	2
RDATA	Variable-length structure containing the timestamp, algorithm, mode, hash data and error	Variable, as per RDLENGTH

== Mode field values ==
- 0 – Reserved
- 1 – Server assignment
- 2 – Diffie–Hellman key exchange
- 3 – Generic Security Service Algorithm for Secret Key Transaction
- 4 – Resolver assignment
- 5 – Key deletion
- 6–65534 – Available
- 65535 – Reserved

== See also ==
- Domain Name System
- List of DNS record types
