= YADIFA =

DNS server software

- Original authors: Eric Diaz Fernandez, Gery Van Emelen
- Developer: EURid
- Release: 2012; 14 years ago
- Stable release: 3.0.10 / September 15, 2026; 12 days ago
- Operating system: Linux, macOS, FreeBSD, Solaris
- Platform: IA-32, x86-64, SPARC, PowerPC, ARM
- Type: DNS server
- License: BSD license
- Website: www.yadifa.eu
- Repository: github.com/yadifa/yadifa

YADIFA /jɑːˈdiːfɑː/ (an acronym for Yet Another DNS Implementation For All) is a lightweight authoritative name server, written in C, with DNSSEC capabilities. It was developed by EURid.

== See also ==
- Comparison of DNS server software
