= Secure64 Software =

Secure64: Server app developer in Fort Collins, CO

Secure64 Software Corporation is a software development company headquartered in Fort Collins, CO, USA, building server applications.

== History ==
Secure64 was founded in 2002 and began full-scale development in 2005. Its founders include Bill Worley, CTO, a former chief scientist of Hewlett Packard and lead developer of PA-RISC and PA-WideWord technologies. Secure64 has filed for several patents.

== Technology ==
=== SourceT Micro OS ===
The SourceT Micro OS executes on standard Itanium server hardware, and provides the foundation for Secure64 software applications. Secure64 uses the term "micro OS" to describe SourceT, because, although it shares attributes of traditional microkernels and monolithic kernels, it does not fit the classical definition of either.

Like microkernels, SourceT adheres to the principles that minimal code should execute in kernel mode (currently less than 4,000 lines of code in SourceT), and that all applications and operating system services such as File system, device drivers and protocol stacks should not execute in kernel mode. However, like monolithic kernel architectures, SourceT's operating system services are accessed through system service calls rather than through interprocess communication with user-mode servers.

Unlike general-purpose operating systems, which are designed to execute on a wide variety of hardware platforms, SourceT was specifically designed to take advantage of some of the unique security and performance features of the Itanium microprocessor to create a high performance, highly secure architecture. These unique Itanium features include:

- Completely independent read/write/execute privileges on memory pages
- Hardware controlled memory compartments with protection IDs
- Separation of control information from data on system stacks
- Inability to execute code from system stacks
- High performance from instruction-level parallelism

=== Self-Protecting Network Stack ===
Secure64 has a patent pending for the queued, non-blocking and self-protecting communications architecture used by SourceT. Designed from the ground up with a queued, scalable architecture that differs significantly from a traditional Berkeley sockets architecture, the network stack accelerates network I/O performance and automatically detects and drops malformed or flooding packets, such as those received as the victim of a Denial-of-service attacks.

== Products ==
Secure64 DNS products are security-hardened commercial DNS appliances, deployed on a COTS 64-bit operating system running on Intel/AMD x86 hardware. Some of these products include:

- Authoritative DNS server, Secure64 DNS Authority
- Caching DNS server, Secure64 DNS Cache
- DNS Network Management, Secure64 DNS Manager
- DNSSEC, Secure64 DNS Signer
- DNS-based Network Security, Secure64 DNS Guard
- Content filtering, Secure64 LineGuard

== See also ==
- Comparison of DNS server software
