= Root zone =

Root zone may refer to:

- roots, of plants
- rhizosphere, of plants
- DNS root zone, the start of the Domain Name System
