= PowerDNS =

Domain name system software project

- Original author: PowerDNS.com B.V.
- Developers: PowerDNS Community, Bert Hubert
- Written in: C++
- Operating system: Unix-like
- Type: DNS server
- License: GNU General Public License v2
- Website: www.powerdns.com
- Repository: github.com/PowerDNS/pdns

PowerDNS is a software project providing a DNS authoritative server, recursor and proxy. It is written in C++ and licensed under the GPL. It runs on most Unix derivatives. PowerDNS features a large number of different backends ranging from simple BIND style zonefiles to relational databases and load balancing/failover algorithms.

== History ==
PowerDNS development began in 1999 and was originally a commercial proprietary product. In November 2002, the source code was made public under the open-source GPL v2 license.

== Components ==
=== Authoritative server ===
PowerDNS Authoritative Server (pdns_server) consists of a general purpose authoritative server, and multiple dynamically loadable backends that both run multi-threaded. The core handles all packet processing and DNS intelligence, while one or more backends deliver DNS records using arbitrary storage methods.

Zone transfers and update notifications are supported, and the processes can run unprivileged and chrooted. Various caches are maintained to speed up query processing. Run-time control is available through the pdns_control command, which allows reloading of separate zones, cache purges, zone notifications and dumps statistics in Multi Router Traffic Grapher / rrdtool format. Realtime information can also be obtained through the optional built-in web server.

There are many independent projects to create management interfaces for PowerDNS.

The PowerDNS Authoritative Server supports DNSSEC as of version 3.0. While pre-signed zones can be served, it is also possible to perform online signing & key management. This has the upside of being relatively easy, but the downside that the cryptographic keying material is present on the servers itself (which is also true of any HTTPS server when not used with a HSM for example).

=== Recursor ===
PowerDNS Recursor (pdns_recursor) is a resolving DNS server, that runs as a separate process.

This part of PowerDNS uses a combination of native threads and user-space threads, through the use of Boost and the MTasker library, which is a simple cooperative multitasking library. It is also available as a standalone package.

It does not have to run a pdns_server process as a gatekeeper for pdns_recursor, if the goal is simply to provide caching/recursing/resolving nameservice as running pdns_recursor on its own is even more efficient than behind the authoritative component.

Support for DNSSEC validation was added to the pdns_recursor in version 4.0.

=== DNSdist ===
PowerDNS DNSdist (dnsdist) is a caching DNS proxy, with many features including:

- Load Balancing of DNS Queries
- DNS Encryption Support - DNS over HTTPS, DNS over TLS, both upstream and downstream (i.e. to clients and backends)
- Lua Policy Engine - Extensive capabilities for creating rules for processing DNS packets, such as changing the response, re-routing a query or blocking traffic over a max QPS from a subnet.
- Dynamic Rule Generation - Used to create Dynamic Blocks which are short-lived rules, automatically inserted based on configurable thresholds and the analysis of recently received traffic. Used to deal with DoS attacks

DNSdist is available as a standalone package, and can be deployed with PowerDNS Authoritative Server or Recursor, or any other third-party DNS server.

== See also ==
- Comparison of DNS server software
