= Nsupdate =

BIND shell command

nsupdate is a computer network maintenance utility used by network administrators to instruct the name server of a DNS zone to update its database. The name server might be local to a domain or, with appropriate authentication and permission provided by DNSSEC, an internet name server.

BIND 8 and later supports this feature.

== See also ==
- Daemon (computer software)
