= Decentralized object location and routing =

In computer science, decentralized object location and routing (DOLR) is a scalable, location-independent routing technology. It uses location-independent names, or aliases, for each node in the network, and it is an example of peer-to-peer networking that uses a structured-overlay system called Tapestry. It was designed to facilitate large internet applications with millions of users physically distributed around the globe and using a variety of wireless and wired interfaces, specifically in situations where a traditional unstructured network of popular Domain Name System servers would fail to perform well.
