= MaraDNS =

Open-source DNS software

- Developer: Sam Trenholme
- Stable release: 3.5.0039 / September 26, 2026; 0 days ago
- Operating system: Unix-like, Windows
- Standard: RFC1034, RFC1035
- Type: DNS server
- License: BSD license
- Website: https://samboy.github.io/MaraDNS/webpage
- Repository: github.com/samboy/MaraDNS

MaraDNS is an open-source (BSD licensed) Domain Name System (DNS) implementation, which acts as either a caching, recursive, or authoritative nameserver.

== Features ==
MaraDNS has a string library, which is buffer overflow resistant and has its own random number generator. While MaraDNS does not directly support BIND zone files, its zone file format is similar and a converter to convert from BIND's zone file format is included. MaraDNS runs as an unprivileged user inside of a chroot environment, while MaraDNS specifies the user and group to run as by user-ID, Simon Burnet has made a patch that makes it possible to supply a username MaraDNS can add both IP records and the corresponding PTR "reverse DNS lookup" record. It can be used as a master DNS server, and, with some caveats, as a slave DNS server. MaraDNS currently does not support DNSSEC because of a lack of money for the developer to implement it using the LibTom library.

Deadwood includes built-in "DNS wall" filtering (to protect against external domains which resolve to local IPs), the ability to read and write the cache to a file, DNS-over-TCP support, the ability to optionally reject MX, IPv6 AAAA, and PTR queries, code that stops AR-spoofing attacks, among other features.

MaraDNS releases are distributed with a BSD-type license.

== See also ==
- Comparison of DNS server software
