= Generic Security Service Algorithm for Secret Key Transaction =

GSS-TSIG (Generic Security Service Algorithm for Secret Key Transaction) is an extension to the TSIG DNS authentication protocol for secure key exchange. It is a GSS-API algorithm which uses Kerberos for passing security tokens to provide authentication, integrity and confidentiality.

GSS-TSIG (RFC 3645) uses a mechanism like SPNEGO with Kerberos or NTLM. In Windows, this implementation is called Secure Dynamic Update.

GSS-TSIG uses TKEY records for key exchange between the DNS client and server in GSS-TSIG mode. For authentication between the DNS client and Active Directory, the AS-REQ, AS-REP, TGS-REQ, TGS-REP exchanges must take place for granting of a ticket and establishing a security context. The security context has a limited lifetime during which dynamic updates to the DNS server can take place.
