= DNS root zone =

Topmost zone in Domain Name System

In computing and the Internet, the DNS root zone is the top-level DNS zone in the hierarchical namespace of the Domain Name System (DNS).

Before October 1, 2016, the root zone had been overseen by the Internet Corporation for Assigned Names and Numbers (ICANN) which delegates the management to a subsidiary acting as the Internet Assigned Numbers Authority (IANA). Distribution services are provided by Verisign. Prior to this, ICANN performed management responsibility under oversight of the National Telecommunications and Information Administration (NTIA), an agency of the United States Department of Commerce. Oversight responsibility transitioned to the global stakeholder community represented within ICANN's governance structures.

A combination of limits in the DNS definition and in certain protocols, namely the practical size of unfragmented User Datagram Protocol (UDP) packets, resulted in a practical maximum of 13 root name server addresses that can be accommodated in DNS name query responses. However, as of 2007, the root zone was serviced by several hundred servers at over 130 locations in many countries.

== Initialization of DNS service ==
The DNS root zone is served by thirteen root server clusters which are authoritative for queries to the top-level domains of the Internet. Thus, every name resolution either starts with a query to a root server or uses information that was once obtained from a root server.

The root servers clusters have the official names a.root-servers.net to m.root-servers.net. To resolve these names into addresses, a DNS resolver must first find an authoritative server for the net zone. To avoid this circular dependency, the address of at least one root server must be known for bootstrapping access to the DNS. For this purpose, operating systems or DNS servers or resolver software packages typically include a file with all addresses of the DNS root servers. Even if the IP addresses of some root servers change, at least one is needed to retrieve the current list of all name servers. This address file is called named.cache in the BIND name server reference implementation. The current official version is distributed by ICANN's InterNIC.

With the address of a single functioning root server, all other DNS information may be discovered recursively, and information about any domain name may be found.

== Redundancy and diversity ==
The root DNS servers are essential to the function of the Internet, as most Internet services, such as the World Wide Web and email, are based on domain names. The DNS servers are potential points of failure for the entire Internet. For this reason, multiple root servers are distributed worldwide. The DNS packet size of 512 octets limits a DNS response to thirteen addresses, until protocol extensions (see Extension Mechanisms for DNS) lifted this restriction. While it is possible to fit more entries into a packet of this size when using label compression, thirteen was chosen as a reliable limit. Since the introduction of IPv6, the successor Internet Protocol to IPv4, previous practices are being modified and extra space is filled with IPv6 name servers.

The root name servers are hosted in multiple secure sites with high-bandwidth access to accommodate the traffic load. At first, all of these installations were located in the United States; however, the distribution has shifted and this is no longer the case. Usually each DNS server installation at a given site is a cluster of computers with load-balancing routers. A comprehensive list of servers, their locations, and properties is available at https://root-servers.org/. As of 24 June 2023, there were 1708 root servers worldwide.

The modern trend is to use anycast addressing and routing to provide resilience and load balancing across a wide geographic area. For example, the j.root-servers.net server, maintained by Verisign, is represented by 104 (as of January 2016) individual server systems located around the world, which can be queried using anycast addressing.

== Management ==
The content of the Internet root zone file is coordinated by a subsidiary of ICANN which performs the Internet Assigned Numbers Authority (IANA) functions. Verisign generates and distributes the zone file to the various root server operators.

In 1997, when the Internet was transferred from U.S. government control to private hands, NTIA exercised stewardship over the root zone. A 1998 Commerce Department document stated the agency was "committed to a transition that will allow the private sector to take leadership for DNS management" by the year 2000, however, no steps to make the transition happen were taken. In March 2014, NTIA announced it would transition its stewardship to a "global stakeholder community".

According to Assistant Secretary of Commerce for Communications and Information, Lawrence E. Strickling, March 2014 was the right time to start a transition of the role to the global Internet community. The move came after pressure in the fallout of revelations that the United States and its allies had engaged in surveillance. The chairman of the board of ICANN denied the two were connected, however, and said the transition process had been ongoing for a long time. ICANN president Fadi Chehadé called the move historic and said that ICANN would move toward multi-stakeholder control. Various prominent figures in Internet history not affiliated with ICANN also applauded the move.

NTIA's announcement did not immediately affect how ICANN performs its role. On March 11, 2016, NTIA announced that it had received a proposed plan to transition its stewardship role over the root zone, and would review it in the next 90 days.

The proposal was adopted, and ICANN's renewed contract to perform the IANA function lapsed on September 30, 2016, resulting in the transition of oversight responsibility to the global stakeholder community represented within ICANN's governance structures. As a component of the transition plan, it created a new subsidiary called Public Technical Identifiers (PTI) to perform the IANA functions which include managing the DNS root zone.

== Data protection of the root zone ==
=== Signing of the root zone ===
Since July 2010, the root zone has been signed with a DNSSEC signature, providing a single trust anchor for the Domain Name System that can in turn be used to provide a trust anchor for other public key infrastructure (PKI). The root zone DNSKEY section is re-signed periodically with the root zone key signing key performed in a verifiable manner in front of witnesses in a key signing ceremony. KSK-2024 with Key Tag 38696 is valid as of 2026 Q4, and has since replaced KSK-2017 as of 11 October 2026 with subsequent KSK-2017 revocation in Q1 2027

=== ZONEMD record ===
While the root zone file is signed with DNSSEC, some DNS records, such as NS records, are not covered by DNSSEC signatures. To address this weakness, a new DNS Resource Record, called ZONEMD, was introduced in RFC 8976. ZONEMD doesn't replace DNSSEC. ZONEMD and DNSSEC must be used together to ensure the full protection of the DNS root zone file.

The ZONEMD deployment for the DNS root zone was completed on December 6, 2023.

=== DNS over TLS ===
The B-Root DNS servers offer experimental support for DNS over TLS (DoT) on port 853.

== See also ==
- Root name server
- Alternative DNS root
- AS112
- Internet backbone
