= BIND =

DNS server software

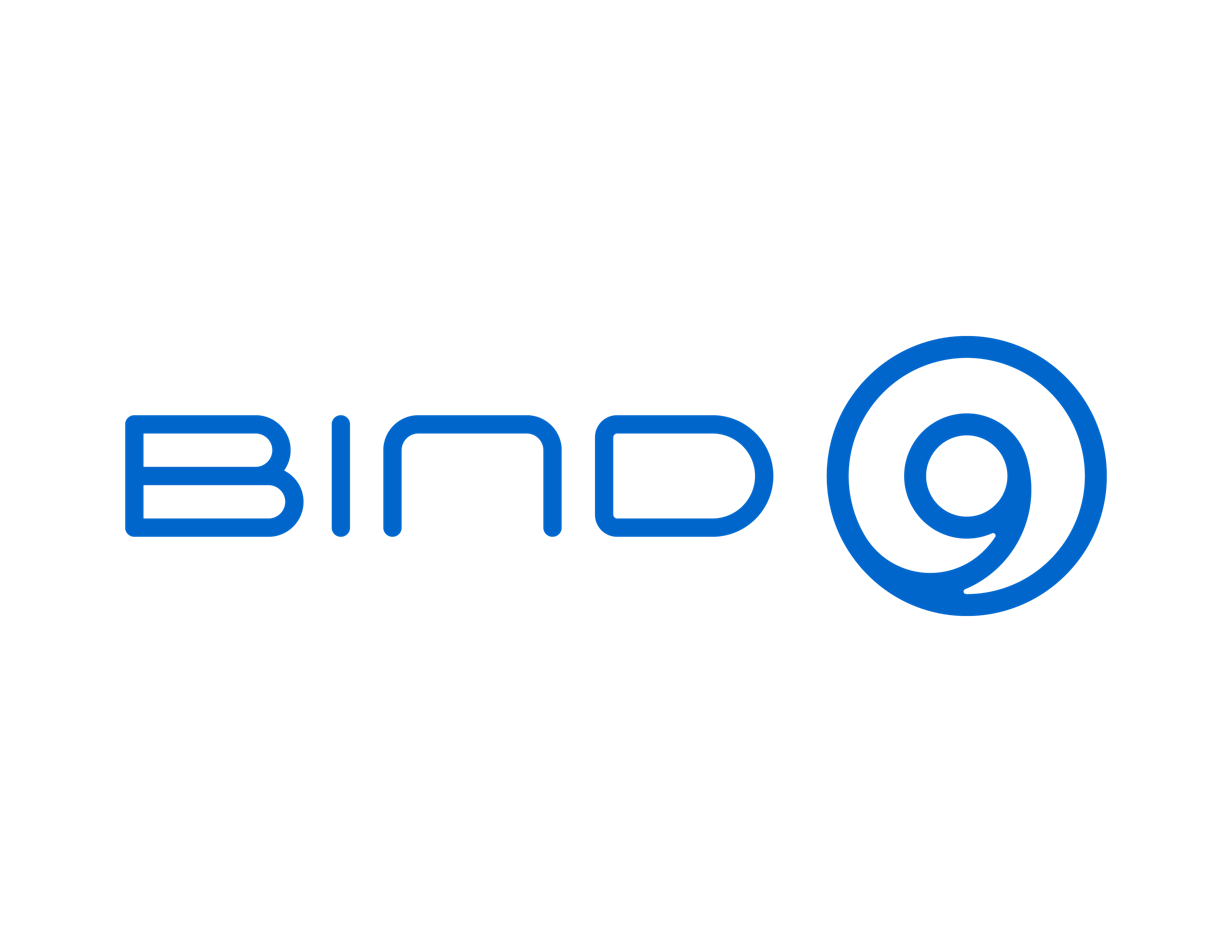
- Original authors: Douglas Terry, Mark Painter, David Riggle, Songnian Zhou
- Developer: Internet Systems Consortium
- Release: June 1986; 40 years ago
- Stable release: 9.20.31 (ESV) / 18 November 2026
- Preview release: 9.21.28 (Experimental) / 18 November 2026
- Operating system: Linux, NetBSD, FreeBSD, OpenBSD, macOS
- Type: DNS server
- License: Mozilla Public License
- Website: www.isc.org/bind/
- Repository: gitlab.isc.org/isc-projects/bind9.git

BIND (/ˈbaɪnd/) is a suite of software for interacting with the Domain Name System (DNS). Its most prominent component, named (pronounced name-dee: /ˈneɪmdiː/, short for name daemon), performs both of the main DNS server roles, acting as an authoritative name server for DNS zones and as a recursive resolver in the network. As of 2015, it is the most widely used domain name server software, and is the de facto standard on Unix-like operating systems. Also contained in the suite are various administration tools such as nsupdate and dig, and a DNS resolver interface library.

The software was originally designed at the University of California, Berkeley (UC Berkeley) in the early 1980s. The name originates as an acronym of Berkeley Internet Name Domain, reflecting the application's use within UC Berkeley. The current version is BIND 9, first released in 2000 and still actively maintained by the Internet Systems Consortium (ISC) with new releases issued several times a year.

== Key features ==
BIND 9 is intended to be fully compliant with the IETF DNS standards and draft standards. Important features of BIND 9 include: TSIG, nsupdate, IPv6, RNDC (remote name daemon control), views, multiprocessor support, Response Rate Limiting (RRL), DNSSEC, and broad portability. RNDC enables remote configuration updates, using a shared secret to provide encryption for local and remote terminals during each session.

== Database support ==
While earlier versions of BIND offered no mechanism to store and retrieve zone data in anything other than flat text files, in 2007 BIND 9.4 DLZ provided a compile-time option for zone storage in a variety of database formats including LDAP, Berkeley DB, PostgreSQL, MySQL, and ODBC.

BIND 10 planned to make the data store modular, so that a variety of databases may be connected. In 2016 ISC added support for the 'dyndb' interface, contributed by RedHat, with BIND version 9.11.0.

== Security ==
Security issues that are discovered in BIND 9 are patched and publicly disclosed in keeping with common principles of open source software. A complete list of security defects that have been discovered and disclosed in BIND9 is maintained by Internet Systems Consortium, the current authors of the software.

The BIND 4 and BIND 8 releases both had serious security vulnerabilities. Use of these ancient versions, or any un-maintained, non-supported version is strongly discouraged. BIND 9 was a complete rewrite, in part to mitigate these ongoing security issues. The downloads page on the ISC web site clearly shows which versions are currently maintained and which are end of life.

== History ==
BIND was originally written by four graduate students at the Computer Systems Research Group (CSRG) at the University of California, Berkeley, Douglas Terry, Mark Painter, David Riggle and Songnian Zhou, in the early 1980s as a result of a DARPA grant. The acronym BIND is for Berkeley Internet Name Domain, from a technical paper published in 1984. It was first released with Berkeley Software Distribution 4.3BSD.

Versions of BIND through 4.8.3 were maintained by the CSRG.

Paul Vixie of Digital Equipment Corporation (DEC) took over BIND development in 1988, releasing versions 4.9 and 4.9.1. Vixie continued to work on BIND after leaving DEC. BIND Version 4.9.2 was sponsored by Vixie Enterprises. Vixie eventually founded the Internet Software Consortium (ISC), which became the entity responsible for BIND versions starting with 4.9.3.

BIND 8 was released by ISC in May 1997.

Version 9 was developed by Nominum, Inc. under an ISC outsourcing contract, and the first version was released 9 October 2000. It was written from scratch in part to address the architectural difficulties with auditing the earlier BIND code bases, and also to support DNSSEC (DNS Security Extensions). The development of BIND 9 took place under a combination of commercial and military contracts. Most of the features of BIND 9 were funded by UNIX vendors who wanted to ensure that BIND stayed competitive with Microsoft's DNS offerings; the DNSSEC features were funded by the US military, which regarded DNS security as important. BIND 9 was released in September 2000.

In 2009, ISC started an effort to develop a new version of the software suite, initially called BIND10. In addition to DNS service, the BIND10 suite also included IPv4 and IPv6 DHCP server components. In April 2014, with BIND10 release 1.2.0 the ISC concluded its involvement in the project and renamed it to Bundy, moving the source code repository to GitHub for further development by outside public efforts. ISC discontinued its involvement in the project due to cost-cutting measures. The development of DHCP components was split off to become a new Kea project.

== See also ==
- Comparison of DNS server software
- DNS management software
- Zone file
