= Discovery and Launch =

Discovery and Launch (DIAL) is a protocol co-developed by Netflix and YouTube with help from Sony and Samsung. It is a mechanism for discovering and launching applications on a single subnet, typically a home network. It relies on Universal Plug and Play (UPnP), Simple Service Discovery Protocol (SSDP), and HTTP protocols. The protocol works without requiring a pairing between devices. It was formerly used by the Chromecast media streaming adapter that was introduced in July 2013 by Google. (Chromecast now uses mDNS instead of DIAL.) DIAL enables what the TV industry calls second screen devices, such as tablet computers and mobile phones to send content to first screen devices, such as televisions, Blu-ray players, and set-top boxes.

== Terminology and operation ==
- 1st screen: a television, Blu-ray player, set-top-box, or similar device.
- 2nd screen: a smartphone, tablet, or similar device.
- DIAL Server: a device implementing the server side of the DIAL protocol, usually a 1st screen device.
- DIAL Client: a device that can discover and launch applications on a DIAL server – usually a 2nd screen device.

The DIAL protocol has two components, DIAL Service Discovery and the DIAL REST Service. The DIAL Service Discovery enables a DIAL client device to discover DIAL servers on its local network segment and obtain access to the DIAL REST Service on those devices. The DIAL REST Service enables a DIAL client to query, launch and optionally stop applications on a DIAL Server device.

== See also ==
- AirPlay
- Digital Living Network Alliance (DLNA)
- Jini
- Miracast
- Neighbor Discovery Protocol
- Service Location Protocol
- Simple Service Discovery Protocol
- Zero-configuration networking
