= DNS Certification Authority Authorization =

Internet security policy mechanism

- Abbreviation: CAA
- Status: Proposed Standard
- First published: October 18, 2010
- Latest version: RFC 8659; November 2019
- Organization: IETF
- Authors: Phillip Hallam-Baker; Rob Stradling; Jacob Hoffman-Andrews
- Base standards: Domain Name System
- Domain: Internet security

DNS Certification Authority Authorization (CAA) is an Internet security policy mechanism for domain name registrants to indicate to certificate authorities whether they are authorized to issue digital certificates for a particular internet domain name. Registrants publish a "CAA" Domain Name System (DNS) resource record, which compliant certificate authorities verify before issuing digital certificates.

CAA was drafted by a pair of computer scientists, Phillip Hallam-Baker and Rob Stradling, in response to increasing concerns about the security of publicly trusted certificate authorities. It is an Internet Engineering Task Force (IETF) proposed internet standard.

== Background ==
A certificate authority compromise leading to a series of incorrectly issued certificate authority certificates occurring from 2001 onwards had first called attention to the possibility and danger of fraudulent domain name certificates, and led to damaged trust in publicly trusted certificate authorities, and accelerated work on various security mechanisms, including Certificate Transparency to track misissuance, HTTP Public Key Pinning and DANE to block misissued certificates on the client side, and CAA to block misissuance on the certificate authority side.

The first draft of CAA was written by Phillip Hallam-Baker and Rob Stradling and submitted as an IETF Internet Draft in October 2010. This was progressively improved by the PKIX Working Group, and approved by the IESG as RFC 6844, a Proposed Standard, in January 2013. CA/Browser Forum discussion began shortly afterward, and in March 2017 they voted in favor of making CAA implementation mandatory for all certificate authorities by September 2017. At least one certificate authority, Comodo, failed to implement CAA before the deadline. A 2017 study by the Technical University of Munich found many instances where certificate authorities failed to correctly implement some part of the standard.

In September 2017, Jacob Hoffman-Andrews submitted an Internet Draft intended to simplify the CAA standard. This was improved by the LAMPS Working Group, and approved as RFC 8659, a Proposed Standard, in November 2019.

As of June 2024, Qualys reports that only 15.4% of the 150,000 most popular TLS-supporting websites use CAA records.

== Record ==
Certificate authorities implementing CAA perform a DNS lookup for CAA resource records, and if any are found, ensure that the authority is listed as an authorized party in at least one of the CAA records before issuing a digital certificate. Each CAA resource record consists of the following components:

flag
A flags byte which implements an extensible signaling system for future use. As of 2018, only the issuer critical flag has been defined, which instructs certificate authorities that they must understand the corresponding property tag before issuing a certificate. This flag allows the protocol to be extended in the future with mandatory extensions, similar to critical extensions in X.509 certificates.
tag
One of the following properties from the IANA Certification Authority Restriction Properties registry:

issue
This property authorizes the holder of the domain specified in the associated property value to issue certificates for the domain for which the property is published.
issuewild
This property acts like issue but only authorizes the issuance of wildcard certificates, and takes precedence over the issue property for wildcard certificate requests.
issuemail
This property authorizes the holder of the domain specified in the associated property value to issue S/MIME certificates for the domain for which the property is published. An absent property does not prevent S/MIME certificate issuance.
issuevmc
This property authorizes the holder of the domain specified in the associated property value to issue BIMI certificates for the domain for which the property is published. An absent property does not prevent BIMI certificate issuance.
iodef
This property specifies a method for certificate authorities to report invalid certificate requests to the domain name holder using the Incident Object Description Exchange Format. As of 2018, not all certificate authorities support this tag, so there is no guarantee that all certificate issuances will be reported.
contactemail
Increasingly, contact information is not available in WHOIS due to concerns about potential GDPR violations. This property allows domain holders to publish contact information in DNS.
contactphone
As above, for phone numbers.

value
The value associated with the chosen property tag.

The lack of any CAA records authorizes normal unrestricted issuance, and the presence of a single issue tag without a specific issuer domain name disallows all issuance.

Third parties monitoring certificate authority behavior might check newly issued certificates against the domain's CAA records. RFC 8659 states: CAA records MAY be used by Certificate Evaluators as a possible indicator of a security policy violation. Such use SHOULD take into account the possibility that published CAA records changed between the time a certificate was issued and the time at which the certificate was observed by the Certificate Evaluator.

== Extensions ==
RFC 8657 specifies "accounturi" and "validationmethods" parameters which allow users to specify desired methods of domain control validation (DCV) as defined in ACME protocol. For example, website administrators can bind a domain they control to a particular account registered with their desired Certification Authority.

=== History ===
A draft of the first extension to the CAA standard was published on October 26, 2016, proposing a new account-uri token to the end of the issue property, which ties a domain to a specific Automated Certificate Management Environment account. This was amended on August 30, 2017, to also include a new validation-methods token, which ties a domain to a specific validation method, and then further amended on June 21, 2018, to remove the hyphen in account-uri and validation-methods making them instead accounturi and validationmethods.

== Examples ==
To indicate that only the certificate authority identified by ca.example.net is authorized to issue certificates for example.com and all subdomains, one may use this CAA record:

example.com.  IN  CAA 0 issue "ca.example.net"

To indicate that ca.example.net and ca.example.org are both authorized to issue certificates for example.com and all subdomains, two CAA records are needed:

example.com.  IN  CAA 0 issue "ca.example.net"
example.com.  IN  CAA 0 issue "ca.example.org"

To disallow any certificate issuance, a semicolon may be used:

example.com.  IN  CAA  0 issue ";"

To indicate that certificate authorities should report invalid certificate requests to an email address and a Real-time Inter-network Defense endpoint:

example.com.  IN  CAA 0 iodef "mailto:security@example.com"
example.com.  IN  CAA 0 iodef "http://iodef.example.com/"

To use a future extension of the protocol, for example, one which defines a new future property, which needs to be understood by the certificate authority before they can safely proceed, one may set the issuer critical flag:

example.com.  IN  CAA  0 issue "ca.example.net"
example.com.  IN  CAA  128 future "value"

== Incidents ==
In 2017, Camerfirma was found to improperly validate CAA records. Camerfirma claimed to have misunderstood the CA/Browser Forum Baseline Requirements describing CAA validation.

In early 2020, Let's Encrypt disclosed that their software improperly queried and validated CAA records potentially affecting over 3 million certificates. Let's Encrypt worked with customers and site operators to replace over 1.7 million certificates, but decided not to revoke the rest to avoid client downtime since the affected certificates would expire in less than 90 days.

== See also ==
- Certificate authority compromise
- Certificate Transparency
- DNS-based Authentication of Named Entities
- HTTP Public Key Pinning
- List of DNS record types
