= Service discovery =

Automatic detection of devices and services on a computer network

Service discovery is the process of automatically detecting devices and services on a computer network. It aims to reduce the manual configuration effort required from users and administrators. A service discovery protocol (SDP) is a network protocol that helps accomplish service discovery.

Service discovery requires a common language to allow software agents to make use of one another's services without the need for continuous user intervention.

== Protocols ==
There are many service discovery protocols, including:

- Bluetooth Service Discovery Protocol (SDP)
- Bonjour, e.g., Apple AirPrint
- DNS Service Discovery (DNS-SD), a component of zero-configuration networking
- DNS, as used for example in Kubernetes
- Dynamic Host Configuration Protocol (DHCP); its classification as a service discovery protocol is controversial
- Internet Storage Name Service (iSNS)
- Jini for Java objects.
- Lightweight Service Discovery (LSD), for mobile ad hoc networks
- Link Layer Discovery Protocol (LLDP) standards-based neighbor discovery protocol similar to vendor-specific protocols which find each other by advertising to vendor-specific broadcast addresses (versus all-1's), such Cabletron (Enterasys) and Cisco Discovery Protocol (both referred to as CDP but different formats).
- Local Peer Discovery, or Local Service Discovery
- Multicast Source Discovery Protocol (MSDP), usually used for unicast exchange of multicast source information between anycast Rendez-Vous Points (RPs) to service mcast clients.
- Service Advertising Protocol used in Novell NetWare networks with IPX
- Service Location Protocol (SLP)
- Session Announcement Protocol (SAP) used to discover RTP sessions
- Simple Service Discovery Protocol (SSDP), a component of Universal Plug and Play (UPnP)
- Universal Description Discovery and Integration (UDDI) for web services
- Universal Service Discovery Protocol (USDP)
- Web Proxy Autodiscovery Protocol (WPAD)
- WS-Discovery (Web Services Dynamic Discovery)
- XMPP Service Discovery (XEP-0030)
- XRDS (eXtensible Resource Descriptor Sequence) used by XRI, OpenID, OAuth, etc.

== See also ==
- Discoverability
- Semantic web
