= Stuart Cheshire =

- Born: Stuart David Cheshire
- Education: Sidney Sussex College (B.A., M.A.); Stanford University (M.Sc., Ph.D)
- Known for: Zeroconf networking (Bonjour/Rendezvous); Consistent Overhead Byte Stuffing (with Mary Baker); Bolo
- Scientific career
- Workplaces: Apple Inc. Stanford University

Stuart David Cheshire is a Distinguished Engineer, Scientist and Technologist at Apple. He pioneered Zeroconf networking while employed at Apple. Zeroconf was originally released by Apple as Rendezvous, but later renamed Bonjour. Subsequently, he co-authored the book Zero Configuration Networking: The Definitive Guide, published by O'Reilly, with Daniel H Steinberg.

He is the author or co-author of 27 IETF request for comments principally concerning multicast DNS and Network address translation.

He is also the author of Bolo, a networked tank game, originally written for the BBC Micro and later ported to the Apple Macintosh.

== Biography ==
=== Education ===
Stuart Cheshire received his B.A. and M.A. degrees from Sidney Sussex College, Cambridge, U.K., in June 1989 and June 1992. He received his M.Sc. and Ph.D. degrees from Stanford University in June 1996 and April 1998.

While at Stanford, Stuart Cheshire and his colleague Mary Baker designed the Consistent Overhead Byte Stuffing algorithm.
