= WS-Discovery =

Multicast discovery protocol

Web Services Dynamic Discovery (WS-Discovery) is a technical specification that defines a multicast discovery protocol to locate services on a local network. It operates over TCP and UDP port 3702 and uses IP multicast address 239.255.255.250 or ff02::c. As the name suggests, the actual communication between nodes is done using web services standards, notably SOAP-over-UDP.

Various components in Microsoft's Windows Vista operating system use WS-Discovery, e.g., "People near me". The component WSDMON in Windows 7 and later uses WS-Discovery to automatically discover WSD-enabled network printers, which show in Network in Windows Explorer, and can be installed by double-clicking on them. In Windows 8 or later, installation is automatic. WS-Discovery is enabled by default in networked HP printers since 2008. WS-Discovery is an integral part of Windows Rally technologies and Devices Profile for Web Services.

The protocol was originally developed by BEA Systems, Canon, Intel, Microsoft, and WebMethods. On July 1, 2009, it was approved as a standard by OASIS.

== See also ==
- Avahi
- Bonjour
- Dynamic Host Configuration Protocol (DHCP)
- Jini
- Link-Local Multicast Name Resolution (LLMNR)
- List of web service specifications
- OSGi Alliance
- Simple Service Discovery Protocol (SSDP)
- Universal Plug and Play (UPnP)
- Web Services Discovery
- Web Services for Devices
- Zero-configuration networking (Zeroconf)
