= Simple Service Discovery Protocol =

Network protocol

- Communication protocol
- Abbreviation: SSDP
- Developer(s): Microsoft, Hewlett-Packard
- Introduction

The Simple Service Discovery Protocol (SSDP) is a network protocol, associated with the Internet protocol suite, for advertisement and discovery of network services and presence information. It accomplishes this without the assistance of server-based configuration mechanisms, such as Dynamic Host Configuration Protocol (DHCP) or the Domain Name System (DNS), and without special static configuration of a network host. SSDP is the basis of the discovery protocol of Universal Plug and Play (UPnP) and is intended for use in residential or small office environments. It was formally described in an IETF Internet Draft by Microsoft and Hewlett-Packard in 1999. Although the IETF proposal has since expired (April, 2000), SSDP was incorporated into the UPnP protocol stack, and a description of the final implementation is included in UPnP standards documents.

== Protocol transport and addressing ==
SSDP is a text-based protocol based on HTTPU, which uses UDP as the underlying transport protocol. Services are announced by the hosting system with multicast addressing to a specifically designated IP multicast address at UDP port number 1900. In IPv4, the multicast address is 239.255.255.250 and SSDP over IPv6 uses the address set ff0x::c for all scope ranges indicated by x.

This results in the following well-known practical multicast addresses for SSDP:

- 239.255.255.250 (IPv4 site-local address)
- ff02::c (IPv6 link-local)
- ff05::c (IPv6 site-local)

Additionally, applications may use the source-specific multicast addresses derived from the local IPv6 routing prefix, with group ID c (decimal 12).

SSDP uses the HTTP method NOTIFY to announce the establishment or withdrawal of services (presence) information to the multicast group. A client that wishes to discover available services on a network uses method M-SEARCH. Responses to such search requests are sent via unicast addressing to the originating address and port number of the multicast request.

Microsoft's IPv6 SSDP implementations in Windows Media Player and Server use the link-local scope address. Microsoft uses port number 2869 for event notification and event subscriptions. However, early implementations of SSDP also used port 5000 for this service.

== DDoS attack ==
In 2014 it was discovered that SSDP was being used in DDoS attacks known as an SSDP reflection attack with amplification. Many devices, including some residential routers, have a vulnerability in the UPnP software that allows an attacker to get replies from port number 1900 to a destination address of their choice. With a botnet of thousands of devices, the attackers can generate sufficient packet rates and occupy bandwidth to saturate links, causing the denial of services. The network company Cloudflare has described this attack as the "Stupidly Simple DDoS Protocol".

== Firefox vulnerability ==
Firefox for Android prior to version 79 did not properly validate the schema of the URL received in SSDP and were vulnerable to remote code execution. An attacker on the same network could create a malicious server pretending to be a device supporting casting, but instead of a configuration file it would return an intent:// URL. Firefox would launch the intent (if it was supported by the device) and thus would execute arbitrary code. This is not a bug with SSDP, just an improper validation performed by Firefox casting service.

== See also ==
- Discovery and Launch
- Jini
- Multicast DNS (mDNS)
- Neighbor Discovery Protocol (NDP)
- Service Location Protocol
- WS-Discovery
- Zero-configuration networking
