= Poettering =

Poettering may refer to:

- Hans-Gert Pöttering (born 1945), German conservative politician
- Lennart Poettering (born 1980), German software engineer
