= Avahi =

Avahi may refer to:

- Avahi, the genus of woolly lemurs
- Avahi (software), a free zero-configuration networking implementation
