= List of DNS record types =

Overview of resource records permissible in zone files of the Domain Name System

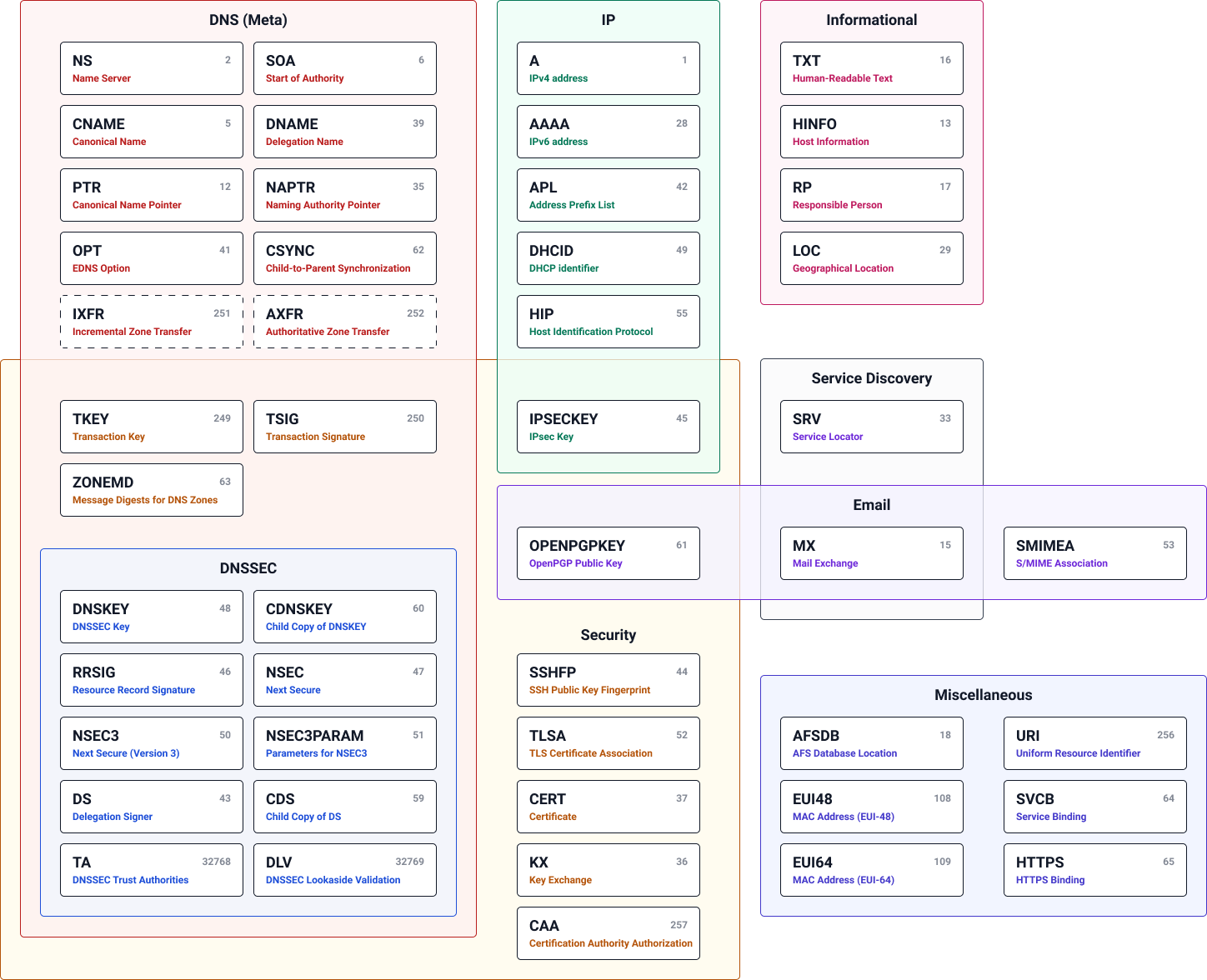
A graphical overview of all active DNS record types

This is an overview of resource records (RRs) permissible in zone files of the Domain Name System (DNS). It also contains pseudo-RRs.

== Resource records ==
Type	Type id (decimal)	Defining RFC	Description	Function
A	1	RFC 1035	Address record	Returns a 32-bit IPv4 address, most commonly used to map hostnames to an IP address of the host, but it is also used for DNSBLs, storing subnet masks, etc.
AAAA	28	RFC 3596	IPv6 address record	Returns a 128-bit IPv6 address, most commonly used to map hostnames to an IP address of the host
AFSDB	18	RFC 1183	AFS database record	Location of database servers of an AFS cell. This record is commonly used by AFS clients to contact AFS cells outside their local domain. A subtype of this record is used by the obsolete DCE/DFS file system.
APL	42	RFC 3123	Address Prefix List	Specify lists of address ranges, e.g. in CIDR format, for various address families. Experimental.
CAA	257	RFC 8659	Certification Authority Authorization	DNS Certification Authority Authorization, constraining acceptable CAs for a host/domain
CDNSKEY	60	RFC 7344		Child copy of DNSKEY record, for transfer to parent
CDS	59	RFC 7344	Child DS	Child copy of DS record, for transfer to parent
CERT	37	RFC 4398	Certificate record	Stores digital certificates in various forms (PKIX, SPKI, PGP, etc)
CNAME	5	RFC 1035	Canonical name record	Alias of one name to another: the DNS lookup will continue by retrying the lookup with the new name.
CSYNC	62	RFC 7477	Child-to-Parent Synchronization	Specify a synchronization mechanism between a child and a parent DNS zone. Typical example is declaring the same NS records in the parent and the child zone.
DHCID	49	RFC 4701	DHCP identifier	Used in conjunction with the FQDN option to DHCP
DLV	32769	RFC 4431	DNSSEC Lookaside Validation record	For publishing DNSSEC trust anchors outside of the DNS delegation chain. Uses the same format as the DS record. RFC 5074 describes a way of using these records.
DNAME	39	RFC 6672	Delegation name record	Alias for a name and all its subnames, unlike CNAME, which is an alias for only the exact name. Like a CNAME record, the DNS lookup will continue by retrying the lookup with the new name.
DNSKEY	48	RFC 4034	DNS Key record	The key record used in DNSSEC. Uses the same format as the KEY record.
DS	43	RFC 4034	Delegation signer	The record used to identify the DNSSEC signing key of a delegated zone
EUI48	108	RFC 7043	MAC address (EUI-48)	A 48-bit IEEE Extended Unique Identifier
EUI64	109	RFC 7043	MAC address (EUI-64)	A 64-bit IEEE Extended Unique Identifier
HINFO	13	RFC 8482 RFC 1035	Placeholder record, or host information	Repurposed to be used while responding to ANY queries. Originally defined as "Host information", intended to inform about host's operating system and hardware. RFC 8482 did not obsolete this conventional meaning for explicit HINFO queries, but rather considers it rarely used.
HIP	55	RFC 8005	Host Identity Protocol	Method of separating the end-point identifier and locator roles of IP addresses
HTTPS	65	RFC 9460	HTTPS Binding	A specialised type of SVCB record. Provides connection information required to establish a secure connection via HTTPS, which would ordinarily be obtained and negotiated during connection to the host. Obtaining the information from the DNS server instead of negotiating it with the host allows for more secure connections (e.g. by using Encrypted Client Hello) and lower latency when the connection to the host is first established.
IPSECKEY	45	RFC 4025	IPsec Key	Key record that can be used with IPsec
KEY	25	RFC 2535 RFC 2930	Key record	Used only for SIG(0) (RFC 2931) and TKEY (RFC 2930). RFC 3445 eliminated their use for application keys and limited their use to DNSSEC. RFC 3755 designates DNSKEY as the replacement within DNSSEC. RFC 4025 designates IPSECKEY as the replacement for use with IPsec.
KX	36	RFC 2230	Key Exchanger record	Used with some cryptographic systems (not including DNSSEC) to identify a key management agent for the associated domain-name. Note that this has nothing to do with DNS Security. It is Informational status, rather than being on the IETF standards-track. It has always had limited deployment, but is still in use.
LOC	29	RFC 1876	Location record	Specifies a geographical location associated with a domain name
MX	15	RFC 1035 RFC 7505	Mail exchange record	List of mail exchange servers that accept email for a domain
NAPTR	35	RFC 3403	Naming Authority Pointer	Allows regular-expression-based rewriting of domain names which can then be used as URIs, further domain names to look up, etc.
NS	2	RFC 1035	Name server record	Delegates a DNS zone to use the given authoritative name servers
NSEC	47	RFC 4034	Next Secure record	Part of DNSSEC—used to prove a name does not exist. Uses the same format as the (obsolete) NXT record.
NSEC3	50	RFC 5155	Next Secure record version 3	An extension to DNSSEC that allows proof of nonexistence for a name without permitting zonewalking
NSEC3PARAM	51	RFC 5155	NSEC3 parameters	Parameter record for use with NSEC3
OPENPGPKEY	61	RFC 7929	OpenPGP public key record	A DNS-based Authentication of Named Entities (DANE) method for publishing and locating OpenPGP public keys in DNS for a specific email address using an OPENPGPKEY DNS resource record
PTR	12	RFC 1035	PTR Resource Record	Pointer to a canonical name. Unlike a CNAME, DNS processing stops and just the name is returned. The most common use is for implementing reverse DNS lookups, but other uses include such things as DNS-SD.
RP	17	RFC 1183	Responsible Person	Information about the responsible person(s) for the domain. Usually an email address with the ⟨@⟩ replaced by a ⟨.⟩
RRSIG	46	RFC 4034	DNSSEC signature	Signature for a DNSSEC-secured record set. Uses the same format as the SIG record.
SIG	24	RFC 2535	Signature	Signature record used in SIG(0) (RFC 2931) and TKEY (RFC 2930). RFC 3755 designated RRSIG as the replacement for SIG for use within DNSSEC.
SMIMEA	53	RFC 8162	S/MIME cert association	Associates an S/MIME certificate with a domain name for sender authentication
SOA	6	RFC 1035 RFC 2308	Start of [a zone of] authority record	Specifies authoritative information about a DNS zone, including the primary name server, the email of the domain administrator, the domain serial number, and several timers relating to refreshing the zone
SRV	33	RFC 2782	Service locator	Generalized service location record, used for newer protocols instead of creating protocol-specific records such as MX
SSHFP	44	RFC 4255	SSH Public Key Fingerprint	Resource record for publishing SSH public host key fingerprints in the DNS, in order to aid in verifying the authenticity of the host. RFC 6594 defines ECC SSH keys and SHA-256 hashes. See the IANA SSHFP RR parameters registry for details.
SVCB	64	RFC 9460	Service Binding	This resource record provides metadata and other information that can help clients connect to the host. The HTTPS record is a specialised SVCB record to help when establishing HTTPS connections. The more general SVCB record can provide other information such as supported protocols, alternative endpoints, and some types of aliasing not supported by CNAME records.
TA	32768	—N/a	DNSSEC Trust Authorities	Part of a deployment proposal for DNSSEC without a signed DNS root. See the IANA database and Weiler Spec for details. Uses the same format as the DS record.
TKEY	249	RFC 2930	Transaction Key record	A method of providing keying material to be used with TSIG that is encrypted under the public key in an accompanying KEY RR
TLSA	52	RFC 6698	TLSA certificate association	A record for DANE. RFC 6698 defines "The TLSA DNS resource record is used to associate a TLS server certificate or public key with the domain name where the record is found, thus forming a 'TLSA certificate association'".
TSIG	250	RFC 2845	Transaction Signature	Can be used to authenticate dynamic updates as coming from an approved client, or to authenticate responses as coming from an approved recursive name server similar to DNSSEC
TXT	16	RFC 1035	Text record	Originally for arbitrary human-readable text in a DNS record. Since the early 1990s, however, this record more often carries machine-readable data, such as specified by RFC 1464, opportunistic encryption, Sender Policy Framework, DKIM, DMARC, DNS-SD, etc.
URI	256	RFC 7553	Uniform Resource Identifier	Can be used for publishing mappings from hostnames to URIs
ZONEMD	63	RFC 8976	Message Digests for DNS Zones	Provides a cryptographic message digest over DNS zone data at rest

== Other types and pseudo-RRs ==
Other types of records simply provide some types of information (for example, an HINFO record gives a description of the type of computer/OS a host uses), or others return data used in experimental features. The "type" field is also used in the protocol for various operations.

Type	Type id.	Defining RFC	Description	Function
*	255	RFC 1035	All cached records	Returns all records of all types known to the name server. If the name server does not have any information on the name, the request will be forwarded on. The records returned may not be complete. For example, if there is both an A and an MX for a name, but the name server has only the A record cached, only the A record will be returned. Usually referred to as ANY (e.g., in dig, Windows nslookup, and Wireshark). In 2019, RFC 8482 standards-track publication led many DNS providers, including Cloudflare, to provide only minimal responses to "ANY" queries, instead of enumerating records.
AXFR	252	RFC 1035	Authoritative Zone Transfer	Transfers entire zone file from the primary name server to secondary name servers
IXFR	251	RFC 1996	Incremental Zone Transfer	Requests a zone transfer of the given zone but only differences from a previous serial number. This request may be ignored and a full (AXFR) sent in response if the authoritative server is unable to fulfill the request due to configuration or lack of required deltas.
OPT	41	RFC 6891	Option	This is a pseudo-record type needed to support EDNS.
ALIAS / ANAME / apex CNAME / CNAME flattening / top-level redirection	-	draft-ietf-dnsop-aname-04	Alias similar to DNAME	An ANAME, ALIAS, apex CNAME, CNAME flattening, or sometimes also top-level redirection record is a pseudo record type and a commonly used but not RFC-standardized record type. Its implementation varies. It serves as an alternative to CNAMEs especially for the bare domain name and where such records should co-exist with others. It causes the DNS software vendor to synthetically generate A and AAAA records similar to the ones of the ANAME-records destination. If the destination changes these synthetic A and AAAA records change automatically as well. The actual mechanisms used are often considered proprietary.

== Obsolete record types ==
Progress has rendered some of the originally defined record-types obsolete. Of the records listed at IANA, some have limited use, for various reasons. Some are marked obsolete in the list, some are for very obscure services, some are for older versions of services, and some have special notes saying they are "not right".

Type	Type id. (decimal)	Defining RFC	Obsoleted by	Description
MD	3	RFC 883	RFC 973	Mail destination (MD) and mail forwarder (MF) records: MAILA is not an actual record type, but a query type which returns MF and/or MD records. RFC 973 replaced these records with the MX record.
MF	4	RFC 883	RFC 973	Mail destination (MD) and mail forwarder (MF) records: MAILA is not an actual record type, but a query type which returns MF and/or MD records. RFC 973 replaced these records with the MX record.
MAILA	254	RFC 883	RFC 973	Mail destination (MD) and mail forwarder (MF) records: MAILA is not an actual record type, but a query type which returns MF and/or MD records. RFC 973 replaced these records with the MX record.
MB	7	RFC 883	Not formally obsoleted. Unlikely to be ever adopted (RFC 2505).	MB, MG, MR, and MINFO are records to publish subscriber mailing lists. MAILB is a query code which returns one of those records. The intent was for MB and MG to replace the SMTP VRFY and EXPN commands. MR was to replace the "551 User Not Local" SMTP error. Later, RFC 2505 recommended that both VRFY and EXPN be disabled, making MB and MG unnecessary. They were classified as experimental by RFC 1035.
MG	8	RFC 883	Not formally obsoleted. Unlikely to be ever adopted (RFC 2505).	MB, MG, MR, and MINFO are records to publish subscriber mailing lists. MAILB is a query code which returns one of those records. The intent was for MB and MG to replace the SMTP VRFY and EXPN commands. MR was to replace the "551 User Not Local" SMTP error. Later, RFC 2505 recommended that both VRFY and EXPN be disabled, making MB and MG unnecessary. They were classified as experimental by RFC 1035.
MR	9	RFC 883	Not formally obsoleted. Unlikely to be ever adopted (RFC 2505).	MB, MG, MR, and MINFO are records to publish subscriber mailing lists. MAILB is a query code which returns one of those records. The intent was for MB and MG to replace the SMTP VRFY and EXPN commands. MR was to replace the "551 User Not Local" SMTP error. Later, RFC 2505 recommended that both VRFY and EXPN be disabled, making MB and MG unnecessary. They were classified as experimental by RFC 1035.
MINFO	14	RFC 883	Not formally obsoleted. Unlikely to be ever adopted (RFC 2505).	MB, MG, MR, and MINFO are records to publish subscriber mailing lists. MAILB is a query code which returns one of those records. The intent was for MB and MG to replace the SMTP VRFY and EXPN commands. MR was to replace the "551 User Not Local" SMTP error. Later, RFC 2505 recommended that both VRFY and EXPN be disabled, making MB and MG unnecessary. They were classified as experimental by RFC 1035.
MAILB	253	RFC 883	Not formally obsoleted. Unlikely to be ever adopted (RFC 2505).	MB, MG, MR, and MINFO are records to publish subscriber mailing lists. MAILB is a query code which returns one of those records. The intent was for MB and MG to replace the SMTP VRFY and EXPN commands. MR was to replace the "551 User Not Local" SMTP error. Later, RFC 2505 recommended that both VRFY and EXPN be disabled, making MB and MG unnecessary. They were classified as experimental by RFC 1035.
WKS	11	RFC 883 RFC 1035	Declared as "not to be relied upon" by RFC 1123 (more in RFC 1127).	Record to describe well-known services supported by a host. Not used in practice. The current recommendation and practice is to determine whether a service is supported on an IP address by trying to connect to it. SMTP is even prohibited from using WKS records in MX processing.
NB	32	RFC 1002		Mistakes (from RFC 1002): The numbers are now assigned to NIMLOC and SRV.
NBSTAT	33	RFC 1002		Mistakes (from RFC 1002): The numbers are now assigned to NIMLOC and SRV.
NULL	10	RFC 883	RFC 1035	Obsoleted by RFC 1035. RFC 883 defined "completion queries" (opcode 2 and maybe 3) which used this record. RFC 1035 later reassigned opcode 2 to be "status" and reserved opcode 3.
A6	38	RFC 2874	RFC 6563	Defined as part of early IPv6 but downgraded to experimental by RFC 3363, later downgraded to historic by RFC 6563
NXT	30	RFC 2065	RFC 3755	Part of the first version of DNSSEC (RFC 2065). NXT was obsoleted by DNSSEC updates (RFC 3755). At the same time, the domain of applicability for KEY and SIG was also limited to not include DNSSEC use.
KEY	25	RFC 2065	RFC 3755	Part of the first version of DNSSEC (RFC 2065). NXT was obsoleted by DNSSEC updates (RFC 3755). At the same time, the domain of applicability for KEY and SIG was also limited to not include DNSSEC use.
SIG	24	RFC 2065	RFC 3755	Part of the first version of DNSSEC (RFC 2065). NXT was obsoleted by DNSSEC updates (RFC 3755). At the same time, the domain of applicability for KEY and SIG was also limited to not include DNSSEC use.
HINFO	13	RFC 883	Unobsoleted by RFC 8482. Currently used by Cloudflare in response to queries of the type ANY.	Record intended to provide information about host CPU type and operating system. It was intended to allow protocols to optimize processing when communicating with similar peers.
RP	17	RFC 1183		RP may be used for certain human-readable information regarding a different contact point for a specific host, subnet, or other domain level label separate than that used in the SOA record.
X25	19	RFC 1183		Not in current use by any notable application
ISDN	20	RFC 1183		Not in current use by any notable application
RT	21	RFC 1183		Not in current use by any notable application
NSAP	22	RFC 1706		Not in current use by any notable application
NSAP-PTR	23	RFC 1706		Not in current use by any notable application
PX	26	RFC 2163		Not in current use by any notable application
EID	31	—N/a		Defined by the Nimrod DNS Internet Draft, but never became an RFC. Not in current use by any notable application.
NIMLOC	32	—N/a		Defined by the Nimrod DNS Internet Draft, but never became an RFC. Not in current use by any notable application.
ATMA	34	—N/a		Defined by The ATM Forum Committee
APL	42	RFC 3123		Specify lists of address ranges, e.g. in CIDR format, for various address families. Experimental.
SINK	40	—N/a		Defined by the Kitchen Sink Internet Draft, but never became an RFC
GPOS	27	RFC 1712		A more limited early version of the LOC record
UINFO	100	—N/a		IANA reserved, no RFC documented them and support was removed from BIND in the early 90s
UID	101	—N/a		IANA reserved, no RFC documented them and support was removed from BIND in the early 90s
GID	102	—N/a		IANA reserved, no RFC documented them and support was removed from BIND in the early 90s
UNSPEC	103	—N/a		IANA reserved, no RFC documented them and support was removed from BIND in the early 90s
SPF	99	RFC 4408	RFC 7208	Specified as part of the Sender Policy Framework protocol as an alternative to storing SPF data in TXT records, using the same format. It was discontinued in RFC 7208 due to widespread lack of support.
NINFO	56	—N/a		Used to provide status information about a zone. Requested for the IETF draft "The Zone Status (ZS) DNS Resource Record" in 2008. Expired without adoption.
RKEY	57	—N/a		Used for encryption of NAPTR records. Requested for the IETF draft "The RKEY DNS Resource Record" in 2008. Expired without adoption.
TALINK	58	—N/a		Defined by the DNSSEC Trust Anchor History Service Internet Draft, but never became an RFC
NID	104	RFC 6742		Not in use by any notable application and marked as "experimental"
L32	105	RFC 6742		Not in use by any notable application and marked as "experimental"
L64	106	RFC 6742		Not in use by any notable application and marked as "experimental"
LP	107	RFC 6742		Not in use by any notable application and marked as "experimental"
DOA	259	—N/a		Defined by the DOA over DNS Internet Draft, but never became an RFC
