= SSDP =

SSDP may refer to:

- Simple Service Discovery Protocol, a networking protocol
- Students for Sensible Drug Policy, an international non-profit advocacy and education organization based in Washington D.C.
