= Canonical domain =

Canonical domain may refer to:

- CNAME record, loosely called a "canonical domain name"
- One of the simply-connected Riemann surfaces – see uniformization theorem
