= Bolo (1987 video game) =

- Developer: Various
- Publisher: Various
- Platforms: BBC Micro, Mac OS, Mac OS X, Linux, Windows
- Release: 1987
- Genre: Tactical shooter
- Modes: Single-player, multiplayer

Bolo is a video game initially created for the BBC Micro computer by Stuart Cheshire in 1987, and was later ported by Cheshire to the Apple Macintosh. Although offered for sale for the BBC Micro, this version is now regarded as lost. It is a networked multiplayer game that simulates a tank battlefield. A Windows-only version known as WinBolo remains in operation and continues to have a small but active player base. More recently, an in-browser multiplayer version called WeBolo has been released, which is also being used to train an artificial intelligence agent.

== Name ==
According to the Bolo Frequently Asked Questions page: "Bolo is the Hindi word for communication. Bolo is about computers communicating on the network, and more importantly about humans communicating with each other, as they argue, negotiate, form alliances, agree strategies, etc."

Another tank game with the same name was created for the Apple II in 1982. In the user manual, Cheshire wrote that this was "an unfortunate coincidence".

Bolo is also the name for a class of self-aware tanks in a series of stories initially published in 1960 by science fiction writer Keith Laumer.

== Description ==
Screenshot from the game

== Networking ==
The Macintosh version of Bolo supported up to sixteen concurrent networked players, using AppleTalk over a Local Area Network, or UDP over the Internet. All AppleTalk network connection types were supported, including LocalTalk, EtherTalk, TokenTalk, and AppleTalk Remote Access. The current Windows version continues to support 16 players, who join via an active games page or the game's Discord channel.
