= SSHFP record =

Type of resource record in the Domain Name System

A Secure Shell fingerprint record (abbreviated as SSHFP record) is a type of resource record in the Domain Name System (DNS) which identifies SSH keys that are associated with a host name. The acquisition of an SSHFP record needs to be secured with a mechanism such as DNSSEC for a chain of trust to be established.

== Structure ==
<span class="nowrap">⟨Name⟩</span> [<span class="nowrap">⟨[[Time to Live|TTL]]⟩</span>] [<span class="nowrap">⟨Class⟩</span>] SSHFP <span class="nowrap">⟨[[Algorithm]]⟩</span> <span class="nowrap">⟨Type⟩</span> <span class="nowrap">⟨[[Hash function|Fingerprint]]⟩</span>

⟨Name⟩
The name of the object to which the resource record belongs (optional)
⟨TTL⟩
Time to live (in seconds). Validity of Resource Records (optional)
⟨Class⟩
Protocol group to which the resource record belongs (optional)
⟨Algorithm⟩
Algorithm (0: reserved, 1: RSA, 2: DSA, 3: ECDSA, 4: Ed25519, 6: Ed448)
⟨Type⟩
Algorithm used to hash the public key (0: reserved, 1: SHA-1, 2: SHA-256)
⟨Fingerprint⟩
Hexadecimal representation of the hash result, as text

== Example ==
host.example.com.  SSHFP 4 2 123456789abcdef67890123456789abcdef67890123456789abcdef123456789

In this example, the host with the domain name host.example.com uses a Ed25519 key with the SHA-256 fingerprint 123456789abcdef67890123456789abcdef67890.

This output would be produced by a ssh-keygen -r host.example.com. command on the target server by reading the existing default SSH host key (Ed25519). In newer releases of the OpenSSH suite, ssh-keyscan -D $HOSTNAME can be used to produce a similar result, by connecting to the host over the network.

== See also ==
- List of DNS record types
