= URI record =

In the Domain Name System, a Uniform Resource Identifier (URI) record (RFC 7553) is a means for publishing mappings from hostnames to URIs.

== Record format ==
The URI record is expressed in a master file in the following format:

_service._proto.name. TTL class URI priority weight target.

where:

service
the symbolic name of the desired service.
proto
the transport protocol of the desired service; this is usually either TCP or UDP.
name
the domain name for which this record is valid, ending in a dot.
TTL
standard DNS time to live field.
class
standard DNS class field (this is always IN).
priority
the priority of the target host, lower value means more preferred.
weight
A relative weight for records with the same priority, higher value means more preferred.
target
This field holds the URI of the target, enclosed in double-quote characters ('"'), where the URI is as specified in RFC 3986

== An example DNS URI resource record ==
_ftp._tcp.example.com.   3600 IN URI 10 1 "ftp://ftp1.example.com/public"

== See also ==
- List of DNS record types
