= Lennart Poettering =

German software engineer

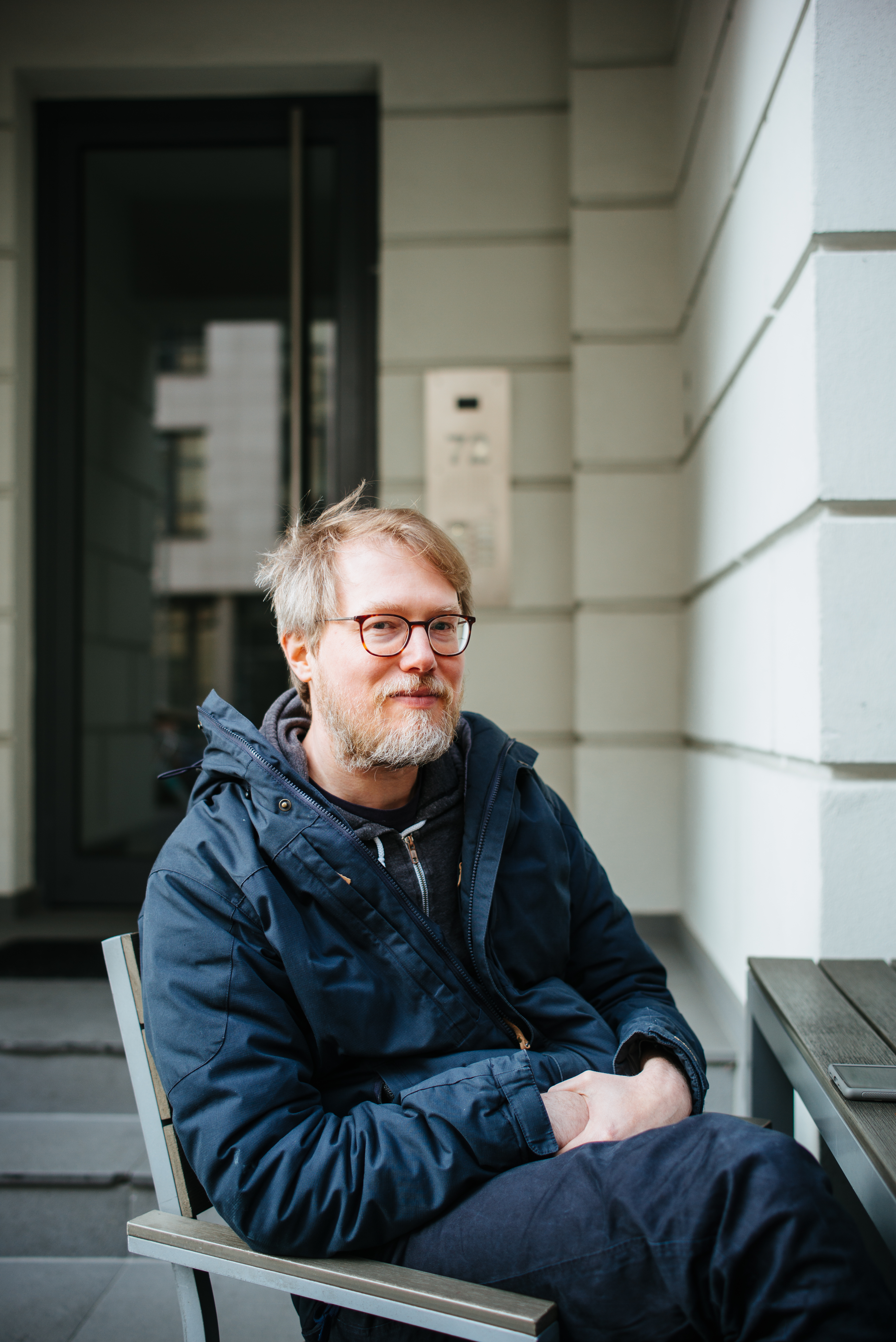
- Poettering in Berlin in 2024
- Born: 15 October 1980 (age 46); Guatemala City, Guatemala
- Occupation: Software engineer
- Employer: Amutable
- Known for: Avahi, PulseAudio, systemd
- Website: 0pointer.de/lennart/

Lennart Poettering (born 15 October 1980) is a German software engineer and the original author of PulseAudio, Avahi and systemd.

== Life and career ==
Interview with LCA TV
interview with Poettering about systemd at linux.conf.au (Perth, Australia); 2014-01

Poettering was born in Guatemala City but grew up in Rio de Janeiro, Brazil, and Hamburg, Germany. Poettering worked for Red Hat from 2008 to 2022. He then joined Microsoft. In 2026, Poettering left Microsoft to cofound Amutable, a company focused on integrity verification for Linux systems.

Since 2003, Poettering has worked on more than 40 projects, mostly written in C. He is the developer and maintainer of several free software projects which have been widely adopted by Linux distributions, including PulseAudio sound server (2004), Avahi zeroconf implementation (2005), and systemd init system (2010).

== Controversies ==
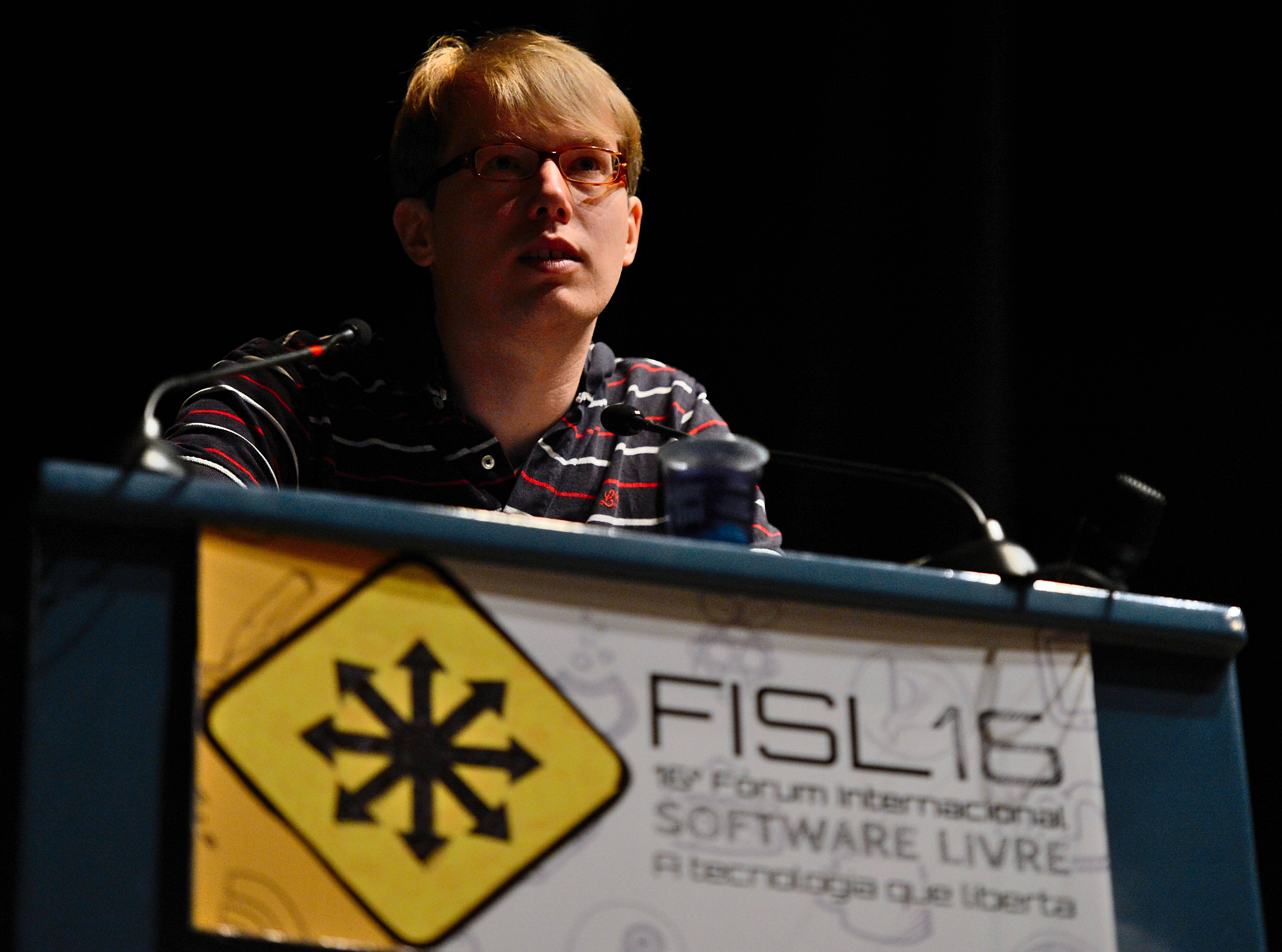
Lennart Poettering at 16th Fórum Internacional de Software Livre, on 10 July 2015

Poettering is known for having controversial technical and architectural positions regarding the Linux ecosystem.

His style has brought accusations that he is working against long-standing Unix philosophy, which he addressed in his blog post The Biggest Myths. For instance, Poettering has advocated speeding up Linux development at the expense of breaking compatibility with POSIX and other Unix-like operating systems such as the BSDs. He took this position because of his experience in writing some other low-level components in the desktop stack. He invites other developers to do the same. Poettering recommends also reading The Linux Programming Interface but ignoring the POSIX-specific parts.

In 2011 Poettering, one of the main developers of PulseAudio, praised the Windows and macOS audio stacks as "more advanced" and called Open Sound System "a simplistic 90's style audio stack" without relevance for a modern desktop.

Also in 2011, when asked why the Linux desktop hadn't been widely adopted by mainstream users, he answered that: "Linux is still too fragmented...[and] needs to be streamlined...". In 2014 Poettering published an essay criticising how software in Linux distros is commonly packaged, updated, and deployed; and laid out proposals for architecture changes, developed by himself, Kay Sievers, Harald Hoyer, Daniel Mack, Tom Gundersen, and David Herrmann.

The controversy around systemd culminated in personal attacks and alleged death threats against Poettering. Poettering went on to put some blame on Linus Torvalds and other kernel developers for being bad role models for encouraging an abusive discussion culture on technical disagreements.
