= Phillip Hallam-Baker =

Computer scientist

Phillip Hallam-Baker is a computer scientist, mostly known for contributions to Internet security, since the design of HTTP at CERN in 1992. Self-employed since 2018 as a consultant and expert witness in court cases, he previously worked at Comodo, Verisign, and the MIT Artificial Intelligence Laboratory. He is a frequent participant in IETF meetings and discussions, and has written a number of RFCs.

He introduced the misspelling of referrer in the original proposal to incorporate the "Referer" header field into the HTTP specification. In 2007 he authored the dotCrime Manifesto: How to Stop Internet Crime; Ron Rivest used it as a source of project ideas for his course on Computer and Network Security at MIT in 2013.

== Biography ==
Hallam-Baker has a degree in electronic engineering from the School of Electronics and Computer Science, University of Southampton and a doctorate in Computer Science from the Nuclear Physics Department at Oxford University. He was appointed a Post Doctoral Research Associate at DESY in 1992 and CERN Fellow in 1993.

Hallam-Baker worked with the Clinton-Gore ’92 Internet campaign. While at the MIT Laboratory for Artificial Intelligence, he worked on developing a security plan and performed work on securing high-profile federal government internet sites.

== IETF Contributions ==
- RFC 2069 with J. Franks, J. Hostetler, P. Leach, A. Luotonen, E. Sink, L. Stewart, An Extension to HTTP : Digest Access Authentication
- RFC 2617 with J. Franks, J. Hostetler, S. Lawrence, P. Leach, A. Luotonen, L. Stewart, HTTP Authentication: Basic and Digest Access Authentication
- RFC 4386 with S. Boeyen, Internet X.509 Public Key Infrastructure Repository Locator Service
- RFC 5585 with T. Hansen, D. Crocker, DomainKeys Identified Mail (DKIM) Service Overview
- RFC 5863 with T. Hansen, E. Siegel, D. Crocker, DomainKeys Identified Mail (DKIM) Development, Deployment, and Operations
- RFC 6277 with S. Santesson, Online Certificate Status Protocol Algorithm Agility
- RFC 6844 with R. Stradling, DNS Certification Authority Authorization (CAA) Resource Record
- RFC 6920 with S. Farrell, D. Kutscher, C. Dannewitz, B. Ohlman, A. Keranen, Naming Things with Hashes
