= Web Services for Devices =

Network protocol

Web Services for Devices or Web Services on Devices (WSD) is a Microsoft API to enable programming connections to web service enabled devices, such as printers, scanners and file shares. Such devices conform to the Devices Profile for Web Services (DPWS). It is an extensible framework that serves as a replacement for older Windows networking functions and a common framework for allowing access to new device APIs.

== Operation ==
The Microsoft Web Services for Devices API (WSDAPI) uses WS-Discovery for device discovery.

Devices that connect to the WSDAPI must implement the DPWS.

== See also ==
- WS-Discovery
- Devices Profile for Web Services
- Features new to Windows Vista
