= Pairing (computing) =

Linking together of devices to allow communications between them

Pairing, sometimes known as bonding, is a process used in computer networking that helps set up an initial linkage between computing devices to allow communications between them. The most common example is used in Bluetooth, where the pairing process is used to link devices like a Bluetooth headset with a mobile phone.
