= Jini =

Network architecture for distributed systems

- License: Apache License 2.0
- Website: river.apache.org

Jini (/ˈdʒiːni/), also called Apache River, is a network architecture for the construction of distributed systems in the form of modular co-operating services. JavaSpaces is a part of the Jini.

Originally developed by Sun Microsystems, Jini was released under the Apache License 2.0. Responsibility for Jini was transferred to Apache in 2007 under the project name "River", but the project was retired in early 2022 due to lack of activity.

== History ==
Sun Microsystems introduced Jini in July 1998. In November 1998, Sun announced that there were some firms supporting Jini.

The Jini team at Sun stated that Jini is not an acronym. Ken Arnold has joked that it means "Jini Is Not Initials", making it a recursive anti-acronym, but it has always been just Jini. The word 'jini' means "the devil" in Swahili; this is borrowed from the Arabic word for a mythological spirit, originated from the Latin genius, which is also the origin of the English word 'genie'.

Jini provides the infrastructure for the Service-object-oriented architecture (SOOA).

Apache River became a top-level project of the Apache Software Foundation in January 2011. It was retired in February 2022, and the move to the Apache Attic was completed in April 2022.

== Using a service ==
Locating services is done through a lookup service. Services try to contact a lookup service (LUS), either by unicast interaction, when it knows the actual location of the lookup service, or by dynamic multicast discovery. The lookup service returns an object called the service registrar that can be used by services to register themselves so they can be found by clients. Clients can use the lookup service to retrieve a proxy object to the service; calls to the proxy translate the call to a service request, performs this request on the service, and returns the result to the client. This strategy is more convenient than Java remote method invocation, which requires the client to know the location of the remote service in advance.

== Limitations ==
Jini uses a lookup service to broker communication between the client and service. This appears to be a centralized model (though the communication between client and service can be seen as decentralized) that does not scale well to very large systems. However, the lookup service can be horizontally scaled by running multiple instances that listen to the same multicast group.

== See also ==
- Jim Waldo, lead architect of Jini
- Ken Arnold, one of the original Jini architects
- Juxtapose (JXTA)
- Java Management Extensions (JMX)
- Simple Network Management Protocol (SNMP)
- Zero Configuration Networking
- OSGi Alliance
- Service Location Protocol
- Universal Plug and Play (UPnP)
- Devices Profile for Web Services (DPWS)
- Tuple space
- CORBA
