= Internet Draft =

Document published by the IETF

An Internet Draft (I-D) is a document published by the Internet Engineering Task Force (IETF) containing preliminary technical specifications, results of networking-related research, or other technical information. Often, Internet Drafts are intended to be work-in-progress documents for work that is eventually to be published as a Request for Comments (RFC) and potentially leading to an Internet Standard.

It is considered inappropriate to rely on Internet Drafts for reference purposes. I-D citations should indicate the I-D is a work in progress.

An Internet Draft is expected to adhere to the basic requirements imposed on any RFC.

An Internet Draft is only valid for six months unless it is replaced by an updated version. An otherwise expired draft remains valid while it is under official review by the Internet Engineering Steering Group (IESG) when a request to publish it as an RFC has been submitted. Expired drafts are replaced with a "tombstone" version and remain available for reference.

== Naming conventions ==
Internet Drafts produced by the IETF working groups follow the naming convention: draft-ietf-<wg>-<name>-<version number>.txt.

Internet Drafts produced by IRTF research groups following the naming convention: draft-irtf-<rg>-<name>-<version number>.txt.

Drafts produced by individuals following the naming convention: draft-<individual>-<name>-<version number>.txt

The IAB, RFC Editor, and other organizations associated with the IETF may also produce Internet Drafts. They follow the naming convention: draft-<org>-<name>-<version number>.txt.

The initial version number is represented as 00. The second version, i.e. the first revision is represented as 01, and incremented for all following revisions.
