= Public recursive name server =

Name resolver service for the Domain Name System

A public recursive name server (also called public DNS resolver) is a name server service that networked computers may use to query the Domain Name System (DNS), the decentralized Internet naming system, in place of (or in addition to) name servers operated by the local Internet service provider (ISP) to which the devices are connected. Reasons for using these services include:

- speed, compared to using ISP DNS services
- filtering (security, ad-blocking, porn-blocking, etc.)
- reporting
- avoiding censorship
- redundancy (smart caching)
- access to unofficial alternative top level domains not found in the official DNS root zone
- temporary unavailability of the ISP's name server

Public DNS resolver operators often cite increased privacy as an advantage of their services; critics of public DNS services have cited the possibility of mass data collection targeted at the public resolvers as a potential risk of using these services. Most services now support secure DNS lookup transport services such as DNS over TLS (DoT), DNS over HTTPS (DoH) and DNS over QUIC (DoQ).

Public DNS resolvers are operated either by commercial companies, offering their service for free use to the public, or by private enthusiasts to help spread new technologies and support non-profit communities.

== Notable public DNS service operators ==
Provider	DNSSEC	Classic DNS (Do53)	DNS over TLS (DoT)	DNS over HTTPS (DoH)	DNS over QUIC (DoQ)	EDNS Padding	DNSCrypt	Hostname	IPv4 addresses	IPv6 addresses	Filters	Privacy policy	Remarks
Alibaba	No	Yes	Yes	Yes	Yes	No	No	dns.alidns.com	223.5.5.5; 223.6.6.6	2400:3200::1; 2400:3200:baba::1	?	No	
AdGuard	Yes	Yes	Yes	Yes	Yes	No	Yes	dns.adguard-dns.com	94.140.14.14; 94.140.15.15	2a10:50c0::ad1:ff 2a10:50c0::ad2:ff	Default: ads and trackers	Yes	
AdGuard	Yes	Yes	Yes	Yes	Yes	No	Yes	family.adguard-dns.com	94.140.14.15; 94.140.15.16	2a10:50c0::bad1:ff 2a10:50c0::bad2:ff	Family: ads, trackers, and adult content	Yes	
AdGuard	Yes	Yes	Yes	Yes	Yes	No	Yes	unfiltered.adguard-dns.com	94.140.14.140; 94.140.14.141	2a10:50c0::1:ff 2a10:50c0::2:ff	None	Yes	
Cloudflare	Yes	Yes	Yes	Yes	No	Yes	No	one.one.one.one 1dot1dot1dot1.cloudflare-dns.com	1.1.1.1; 1.0.0.1	2606:4700:4700::1111; 2606:4700:4700::1001	None	Yes	
Cloudflare	Yes	Yes	Yes	Yes	No	Yes	No	security.cloudflare-dns.com	1.1.1.2; 1.0.0.2	2606:4700:4700::1112; 2606:4700:4700::1002	Malware, Phishing	Yes	
Cloudflare	Yes	Yes	Yes	Yes	No	Yes	No	family.cloudflare-dns.com	1.1.1.3; 1.0.0.3	2606:4700:4700::1113; 2606:4700:4700::1003	Malware, Phishing, Adult content	Yes	
Cloudflare	Yes	Yes	Yes	Yes	No	Yes	No	dns64.cloudflare-dns.com	—N/a	2606:4700:4700::64; 2606:4700:4700::6400	None	Yes	Intended to be IPv6-only. See NAT64 and DNS64.
DNS4EU	Yes	Yes	Yes	Yes	No	Yes	No	protective.joindns4.eu	86.54.11.1; 86.54.11.201	2a13:1001::86:54:11:1 2a13:1001::86:54:11:201	Malware, phishing	Yes	Developed for EU citizens
DNS4EU	Yes	Yes	Yes	Yes	No	Yes	No	child-noads.joindns4.eu	86.54.11.11; 86.54.11.211	2a13:1001::86:54:11:11 2a13:1001::86:54:11:211	Malware, phishing, adult content, ads	Yes	Developed for EU citizens
DNS4EU	Yes	Yes	Yes	Yes	No	Yes	No	child.joindns4.eu	86.54.11.12; 86.54.11.212	2a13:1001::86:54:11:12 2a13:1001::86:54:11:212	Malware, phishing, adult content	Yes	Developed for EU citizens
DNS4EU	Yes	Yes	Yes	Yes	No	Yes	No	noads.joindns4.eu	86.54.11.13; 86.54.11.213	2a13:1001::86:54:11:13 2a13:1001::86:54:11:213	Malware, phishing, ads	Yes	Developed for EU citizens
DNS4EU	Yes	Yes	Yes	Yes	No	Yes	No	unfiltered.joindns4.eu	86.54.11.100; 86.54.11.200	2a13:1001::86:54:11:100 2a13:1001::86:54:11:200	None	Yes	Developed for EU citizens
Google	Yes	Yes	Yes	Yes	No	Yes	No	dns.google	8.8.8.8; 8.8.4.4	2001:4860:4860::8888; 2001:4860:4860::8844	None	Yes	
Google	Yes	Yes	Yes	Yes	No	Yes	No	dns64.dns.google	—N/a	2001:4860:4860::6464; 2001:4860:4860::64	None	Yes	Intended for networks with NAT64 gateway.
Gcore	Yes	Yes	No	No	No	No	No	—N/a	95.85.95.85; 2.56.220.2	2a03:90c0:999d::1 2a03:90c0:9992::1	None	Yes	
Mullvad	Yes	No	Yes	Yes	No	Yes	No	dns.mullvad.net	194.242.2.2	2a07:e340::2	None	Only for VPN service available	Can be used without its VPN service Shutting down on November 2nd 2026
Mullvad	Yes	No	Yes	Yes	No	Yes	No	adblock.dns.mullvad.net	194.242.2.3	2a07:e340::3	Ads, and trackers	Only for VPN service available	Can be used without its VPN service Shutting down on November 2nd 2026
Mullvad	Yes	No	Yes	Yes	No	Yes	No	base.dns.mullvad.net	194.242.2.4	2a07:e340::4	Ads, trackers, and malware	Only for VPN service available	Can be used without its VPN service Shutting down on November 2nd 2026
Mullvad	Yes	No	Yes	Yes	No	Yes	No	extended.dns.mullvad.net	194.242.2.5	2a07:e340::5	Ads, trackers, malware, and social media	Only for VPN service available	Can be used without its VPN service Shutting down on November 2nd 2026
Mullvad	Yes	No	Yes	Yes	No	Yes	No	all.dns.mullvad.net	194.242.2.9	2a07:e340::9	Ads, trackers, malware, social media, gambling and adult content	Only for VPN service available	Can be used without its VPN service Shutting down on November 2nd 2026
Vercara (formerly Neustar Security Services)	Yes	Yes	No	No	No	No	No	?	64.6.64.6; 64.6.65.6	2620:74:1b::1:1 2620:74:1c::2:2	None	Yes	Verisign transferred its public DNS to Neustar.
Vercara (formerly Neustar Security Services)	Yes	Yes	No	No	No	No	No	?	156.154.70.1; 156.154.71.1	2610:a1:1018::1 2610:a1:1019::1	None	Yes	
Vercara (formerly Neustar Security Services)	Yes	Yes	No	No	No	No	No	?	156.154.70.2; 156.154.71.2	2610:a1:1018::2 2610:a1:1019::2	Malware, ransomware, spyware, phishing	Yes	
Vercara (formerly Neustar Security Services)	Yes	Yes	No	No	No	No	No	?	156.154.70.3; 156.154.71.3	2610:a1:1018::3 2610:a1:1019::3	Low security + gambling, pornography, violence, hate	Yes	
Vercara (formerly Neustar Security Services)	Yes	Yes	No	No	No	No	No	?	156.154.70.4; 156.154.71.4	2610:a1:1018::4 2610:a1:1019::4	Medium security + gaming, adult, drugs, alcohol, anonymous proxies	Yes	
Vercara (formerly Neustar Security Services)	Yes	Yes	No	No	No	No	No	?	156.154.70.5; 156.154.71.5	2610:a1:1018::5 2610:a1:1019::5	None	Yes	Will not redirect non-existent domains to a landing page.
OpenDNS (Cisco Umbrella)	Yes	Yes	Yes	No	No	Yes	Yes	dns.opendns.com dns.umbrella.com	208.67.222.222; 208.67.220.220	2620:119:35::35; 2620:119:53::53	Basic Security filtering + user defined policies	Yes	
OpenDNS (Cisco Umbrella)	Yes	Yes	Yes	No	No	Yes	Yes	familyshield.opendns.com	208.67.222.123; 208.67.220.123	2620:119:35::123; 2620:119:53::123	FamilyShield: adult content	Yes	
OpenDNS (Cisco Umbrella)	Yes	Yes	Yes	No	No	Yes	Yes	sandbox.opendns.com	208.67.222.2; 208.67.220.2	2620:0:ccc::2 2620:0:ccd::2	None	Yes	Sandbox addresses that provide no filtering.
Oracle (formerly Dyn)	Yes	Yes	No	No	No	No	No	resolver1.dyndnsinternetguide.com resolver2.dyndnsinternetguide.com rdns.dynect.net	216.146.35.35; 216.146.36.36	—N/a	None	Yes	
Quad9	Yes	Yes	Yes	Yes	Yes	No	Yes	dns.quad9.net	9.9.9.9; 149.112.112.112	2620:fe::9 2620:fe::fe	Phishing, malware, and exploit kit domains	Yes	
Quad9	Yes	Yes	Yes	Yes	Yes	No	Yes	dns11.quad9.net	9.9.9.11; 149.112.112.11	2620:fe::11 2620:fe::fe:11	Phishing, malware, and exploit kit domains	Yes	Passes EDNS Client Subnet.
Quad9	No	Yes	Yes	Yes	Yes	No	Yes	dns10.quad9.net	9.9.9.10; 149.112.112.10	2620:fe::10 2620:fe::fe:10	None	Yes	
Tencent	Yes	Yes	Yes	Yes	Yes	Yes	No	dns.pub	119.29.29.29	2402:4e00:: 2402:4e00:1::	none	No	Chinese regulations
Wikimedia	Yes	No	Yes	Yes	No	Yes	No	wikimedia-dns.org	185.71.138.138	2001:67c:930::1	None	Informal	
Yandex	No	Yes	Yes	Yes	No	Yes	Yes	common.dot.dns.yandex.net	77.88.8.8; 77.88.8.1	2a02:6b8::feed:0ff 2a02:6b8:0:1::feed:0ff	None	No	
Yandex	No	Yes	Yes	Yes	No	Yes	Yes	safe.dot.dns.yandex.net	77.88.8.88; 77.88.8.2	2a02:6b8::feed:bad 2a02:6b8:0:1::feed:bad	Safe: fraudulent / infected / bot sites	No	
Yandex	No	Yes	Yes	Yes	No	Yes	Yes	family.dot.dns.yandex.net	77.88.8.7; 77.88.8.3	2a02:6b8::feed:a11 2a02:6b8:0:1::feed:a11	Family: fraudulent / infected / bot / adult sites	No	
