= 1.1.1.1 =

Free DNS service maintained by Cloudflare in partnership with APNIC

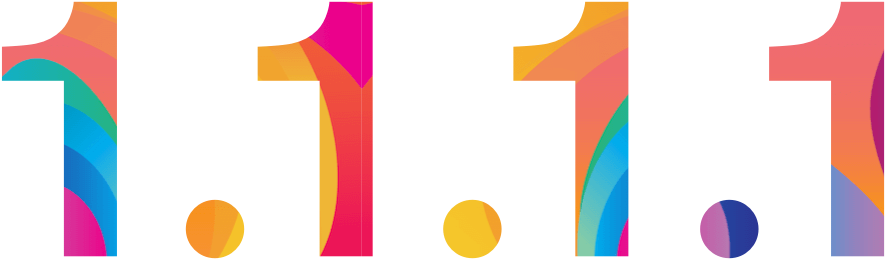
- Developer: Cloudflare
- Release: April 1, 2018; 8 years ago
- Stable release: Android: 6.38.7 iOS: 6.31.4; Linux: Varies per OS macOS: 2026.3.846.0; Windows: 2026.3.851.0
- Platform: Android, iOS, Linux, macOS, Windows
- Website: one.one.one.one

1.1.1.1 is a free Domain Name System (DNS) service by the American company Cloudflare that was started in a partnership with APNIC. The service functions as a recursive name server, providing domain name resolution for any host on the Internet. The service was announced on April 1, 2018. On November 11, 2018, Cloudflare announced a mobile application of their 1.1.1.1 service for Android and iOS. On September 25, 2019, Cloudflare released WARP, an upgraded version of their original 1.1.1.1 mobile application.

== Service ==
The 1.1.1.1 DNS service operates recursive name servers for public use at the twelve IP addresses listed below. These addresses are mapped to the nearest operational server by anycast routing. The DNS service is also available for Tor clients via an onion address. Users can set up the service by manually changing their DNS resolvers to the IP addresses below. Cloudflare also offers 1.1.1.1 client applications for Android, iOS, Windows, macOS and Linux; the apps primarily act as a VPN-like service (Cloudflare WARP) that routes and secures device traffic, and they also configure the system DNS resolvers to use Cloudflare's 1.1.1.1 service.

	1.1.1.1	1.1.1.1 for Families	
Filters domains	No	Blocks malware	Blocks malware and adult content
Passes ECS	No		
Validates DNSSEC	Yes		
Via DoH	https://cloudflare-dns.com/dns-query	https://security.cloudflare-dns.com/dns-query	https://family.cloudflare-dns.com/dns-query
Via DoT	one.one.one.one 1dot1dot1dot1.cloudflare-dns.com	security.cloudflare-dns.com	family.cloudflare-dns.com
Via IPv4	1.1.1.1; 1.0.0.1	1.1.1.2; 1.0.0.2	1.1.1.3; 1.0.0.3
Via IPv6	2606:4700:4700::1111; 2606:4700:4700::1001	2606:4700:4700::1112; 2606:4700:4700::1002	2606:4700:4700::1113; 2606:4700:4700::1003

== Technology ==
1.1.1.1 is a recursive DNS resolver. Cloudflare runs an authoritative DNS resolver with a network of over 20 million Internet properties. With the recursor and the resolver on the same network, some DNS queries can be answered directly.

With the release of the 1.1.1.1 mobile application in November 2018, Cloudflare added the ability for users to encrypt their DNS queries over HTTPS (DoH) or TLS (DoT). Later on, a VPN tunnel was implemented based on Cloudflare's own BoringTun, a user-space implementation of WireGuard written in Rust.

=== Prior usage of the IP address ===
Technology websites noted that by using 1.1.1.1 as the IP address for its service, Cloudflare exposed misconfigurations in existing setups that violated Internet standards (such as RFC 1918). 1.1.1.1 was not a reserved IP address yet was abused by many existing routers (mostly those sold by Cisco Systems) and companies for hosting login pages to private networks, exit pages or other purposes, rendering the proper routing of 1.1.1.1 impossible on those systems. Additionally, 1.1.1.1 is blocked on many networks and by multiple ISPs because the simplicity of the address means that it was previously often used inappropriately for testing purposes and not legitimate use. These abuses have led to a huge influx of garbage data to Cloudflare's servers.

=== Cleanup of 1.1.1.1 and 1.0.0.1 ===
The 1.0.0.0/8 IP block was assigned in 2010 to APNIC; before this time it was unassigned space. An unassigned IP space, however, is not the same as a reserved IP space for private use (called a reserved IP address). For example, AT&T has said that it was working on fixing a routing issue within its CPE hardware that prevented access to 1.1.1.1.

== WARP ==
In September 2019, Cloudflare released a VPN-like service, called WARP, which is built into the 1.1.1.1 app. WARP is based on Cloudflare's own WireGuard implementation written in Rust called BoringTun. It tunnels the connection between device and nearest Cloudflare data center, claiming to increase connection speed, encrypting data and DNS requests. Connection speed gain is claimed to be achieved by converting TCP traffic to UDP (both IPv4 and IPv6 are supported), DNS resolution inside Cloudflare's network, and direct access to sites which are using Cloudflare's infrastructure.

WARP connects the user through an encrypted tunnel to the closest Cloudflare data center, thereby hiding any traffic from intermediaries such as local network operators or Internet Service Providers. If the user is trying to reach a site or service outside the Cloudflare network, WARP will replace the user's IP address with a Cloudflare address that represents the user's approximate location, thus hiding the user's identity from the site or service. Previously, if a user tried to reach a destination managed by Cloudflare, the destination was provided with the user's true IP address in an X_FORWARDED_FOR header. However, Cloudflare later updated the consumer WARP service to no longer expose the user's actual IP address to Cloudflare-protected sites.

=== WARP+ and WARP+ Unlimited ===
WARP+ routes users' Internet traffic into less congested pathways using Cloudflare's own private backbone, called Argo, which makes it much faster than basic WARP.

WARP+ historically was a limited data plan. To get more data to use WARP+, users had to refer more people to use the service. The WARP+ Referral program is no longer available and has been discontinued.

As of November 2025, WARP+ (aka WARP+ Unlimited) is a paid monthly subscription with no data limits.

== See also ==
- 8.8.8.8, a similar public DNS service by Google
- DNS over HTTPS
- DNS over TLS
- Public recursive name server
- IPv4 and IPv6
- Quad9
