= DNS4EU =

EU initiative for a DNS resolver service

- Developers: Whalebone (consortium leader), CZ.NIC, CVUT, Time.lex, deSEC, HUN-REN, ABILAB, NASK, DNSC
- Initial release: June 9, 2025; 5 months ago
- Type: DNS resolver
- License: Free for public use
- Website: www.joindns4.eu
- ASN: 198121

DNS4EU is a European Union initiative providing a secure, privacy-compliant Domain Name System (DNS) resolver service. Launched on June 9, 2025, it aims to enhance EU digital sovereignty by offering an alternative to non-EU DNS resolvers. Co-funded by the EU, it is managed by a consortium from 10 EU countries, led by Czech cybersecurity company Whalebone.

== Overview ==
DNS4EU provides Domain Name System resolution services (translating domain names into IP addresses for accessing internet resources). The service focuses on security, privacy, and compliance with EU regulations including the General Data Protection Regulation (GDPR). It addresses concerns about European dependence on non-EU DNS providers and associated data privacy and cybersecurity risks.

The service operates entirely within EU borders to ensure GDPR compliance and prohibits data monetization. Regional threat intelligence sharing via CERTs enables rapid response to cyber threats across multiple EU countries simultaneously.

DNS4EU operates as a voluntary service that is not controlled by the European Commission, supporting net neutrality principles and avoiding censorship. The EU does not have access to configuration data or user information, and the service complies with local regulations required of internet service providers.

== Services ==
DNS4EU offers three main categories of DNS resolution services.

=== Public resolver ===
A free public DNS resolver is available to individual users with five configuration options:

	Protected DNS	Protected + Child Protection	Protected + Ad Blocking	Full Protection	Unfiltered
Filters malicious and fraudulent websites	Yes	Yes	Yes	Yes	No
Filters content inappropriate for children	No	Yes	No	Yes	No
Filters advertising	No	No	Yes	Yes	No
Via DoH	https://protective.joindns4.eu/dns-query	https://child.joindns4.eu/dns-query	https://noads.joindns4.eu/dns-query	https://child-noads.joindns4.eu/dns-query	https://unfiltered.joindns4.eu/dns-query
Via DoT	protective.joindns4.eu	child.joindns4.eu	noads.joindns4.eu	child-noads.joindns4.eu	unfiltered.joindns4.eu
Via IPv4	86.54.11.1; 86.54.11.201	86.54.11.12; 86.54.11.212	86.54.11.13; 86.54.11.213	86.54.11.11; 86.54.11.211	86.54.11.100; 86.54.11.200
Via IPv6	2a13:1001::86:54:11:1 2a13:1001::86:54:11:201	2a13:1001::86:54:11:12 2a13:1001::86:54:11:212	2a13:1001::86:54:11:13 2a13:1001::86:54:11:213	2a13:1001::86:54:11:11 2a13:1001::86:54:11:211	2a13:1001::86:54:11:100 2a13:1001::86:54:11:200

=== Government and public institutions ===
DNS4EU provides specialized DNS-level protection for ministries, local governments, municipalities, healthcare systems, and educational institutions. This service helps organizations comply with regulatory requirements while outsourcing DNS security infrastructure management.

=== Telecommunications providers ===
The service offers DNS resolution solutions for telecommunications companies and Internet Service Providers, allowing them to provide DNS4EU services to their entire customer base with minimal operational overhead.

== History ==
DNS4EU development began in January 2023, prompted by European Commission concerns over EU reliance on a small number of non-EU DNS providers, which posed risks to digital infrastructure stability. The initiative aligns with the EU's Cybersecurity Strategy and NIS 2 Directive, which specifically encourages member states to "encourage the development and use of public and secure European DNS resolver service."

The project received EU co-funding from 2023 to 2025, with plans for commercial sustainability thereafter. The service officially launched on June 9, 2025, after more than two years of development.

== Consortium ==
The DNS4EU consortium comprises cybersecurity companies, CERTs, and academic institutions from ten European Union countries. Whalebone, a Czech cybersecurity company specializing in DNS security for telecommunications and enterprises, leads the consortium. Other core members include CZ.NIC and CVUT from the Czech Republic, Time.lex from Belgium providing data protection legal expertise, deSEC from Germany contributing open-source DNS solutions, and cybersecurity organizations from Hungary (HUN-REN), Italy (ABILAB), Poland (NASK), and Romania (DNSC). Associated partners include F-Secure from Finland and CESNET from the Czech Republic, who provide consultation and threat intelligence sharing.

== See also ==
- Digital sovereignty
- Public recursive name server
