= RPZ =

RPZ may refer to:

- Reduced pressure zone device, a type of backflow prevention device
- Response policy zone, a mechanism for use by Domain Name System recursive resolvers
- Residents parking zone, practice of designating certain on-street car parking spaces for the exclusive use of nearby residents
