= Unbound (DNS server) =

Domain Name System software

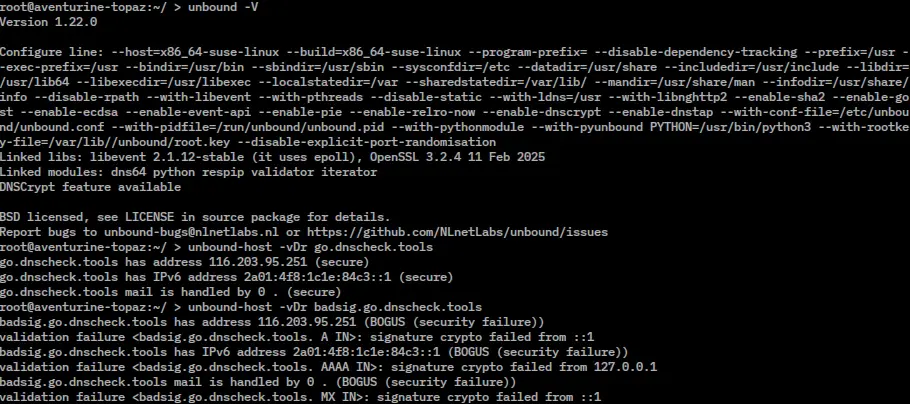
- Screenshot of Unbound 1.22.0, showing version information, build configuration, and usage of unbound-host to check DNSSEC validation
- Developer: NLnet Labs
- Initial release: February 19, 2007; 18 years ago
- Stable release: 1.24.2 / 26 November 2025; 47 days ago
- Repository: Unbound by NLnetLabs on GitHub
- Written in: C
- Operating system: Unix-like, Windows
- Type: DNS server
- License: BSD-3-Clause
- Website: unbound.net

Unbound is a validating, recursive, and caching DNS resolver software product from NLnet Labs. It is distributed free of charge in open-source form under the Modified BSD License.

== Features ==
- Caching resolver with prefetching of popular items before they expire
- DNS over TLS forwarding and server, with domain-validation
- DNS over HTTPS
- DNS over QUIC
- Query name minimization
- Aggressive use of DNSSEC-Validated Cache
- Authority zones, for a local copy of the root zone
- DNS64
- DNSCrypt
- Domain Name System Security Extensions (DNSSEC) validating
- EDNS client subnet

== History ==
Originally designed by Jakob Schlyter of Kirei and Roy Arends of Nominet in 2004, funding was provided by VeriSign and ep.net to develop a prototype written in Java (David Blacka and Matt Larson, VeriSign). In 2006, the prototype was re-written for high-performance in the C programming language by NLnet Labs.

Unbound is designed as a set of modular components that incorporate modern features, such as enhanced security (DNSSEC) validation, Internet Protocol Version 6 (IPv6), and a client resolver application programming interface library as an integral part of the architecture. Originally written for POSIX-compatible Unix-like operating system, it runs on FreeBSD, OpenBSD, NetBSD, macOS, and Linux, as well as Microsoft Windows.

== Reception ==
Unbound has supplanted the Berkeley Internet Name Daemon (BIND) as the default, base-system name server in FreeBSD and OpenBSD, where it is perceived as smaller, more modern, and more secure for most applications.

== See also ==
- NSD, an authoritative name server, also from NLnet Labs
- Comparison of DNS server software
