= DNS management software =

Software controlling Domain Name System clusters

DNS management software is computer software that controls Domain Name System (DNS) server clusters. DNS data is typically deployed on multiple physical servers. The main purposes of DNS management software are:

- to reduce human error when editing complex and repetitive DNS data
- to reduce the effort required to edit DNS data
- to validate DNS data before it is published to the DNS servers
- to automate the distribution of DNS data

== Background ==
The rapid expansion of the internet in the mid-1990s exposed the limitations of manual DNS management. Between 1995 and mid-1997, the number of registered domains grew from 70,000 to over 1.3 million. Early administration relied on the BIND software, where registration was often handled via email and zone files were edited manually using text editors. As hosting providers began managing hundreds of thousands of zones, several critical inefficiencies emerged:

- Manual Error & Server Downtime: Syntax errors in manually edited zone files could cause BIND to fail during reloads, leading to service outages.
- Scalability Bottlenecks: On contemporary hardware, full BIND reloads for large datasets could take several hours.
- Propagation Delays: The combination of manual edits and slow processing often resulted in DNS changes taking more than 24 hours to propagate across the network.

To address these hurdles, administrators first developed in-house Perl and Shell scripts for automation. This eventually led to the birth of dedicated DNS management software, designed to provide data validation, reduce human error, and automate distribution across server clusters.

== DNS and databases ==
While struggling with the challenges of editing zone files, more than a few sysadmins noticed that SQL is a terrific place to store DNS data. By moving the Single Source of Truth from text files into SQL, DNS data could be validated and constrained before acceptance into the database. Export scripts could convert the SQL to zone files. Rsync could replace named-xfer for distribution, increasing security and reducing propagation time. Among large hosting providers, it became fashionable to store DNS data in SQL and build a custom interface for managing it. mysqlBind is one such DNS manager. It provides a web interface for data input and exports the data to BIND zone files.

In 2000, Daniel J. Bernstein released Djbdns. One of the novel features was that tinydns, the included authoritative DNS server, served DNS directly from a CDB database. The cdb had to be compiled from a plain text file whose format was designed to be edited by scripts. Tinydns quickly became the second most popular DNS server and a number of DNS managers were released for it, including: VegaDNS, SuaveDNS, and NicTool.

In 2005, PowerDNS was released. One of its features was the ability to serve DNS data directly out of the SQL database, bypassing the export step entirely. PowerDNS also spawned a number of DNS managers that provide web interfaces to its SQL data store.

== DDNS ==
Using the RFC2136 DDNS update protocol, it is possible to change DNS zones without accessing the zone files. Management tools known to work that way are Admin4 and NicTool via its nsupdate export mechanism.

== Service providers ==
DNS service providers often deploy different types of DNS servers in their networks. In addition, different answers may be provided to DNS clients based on the clients' geographic location, as determined by their IP address (GeoIP). The most practical way to manage such critical Internet infrastructure has been to rely on databases and complex DNS management software to ensure homogeneity and avoid single points of deployment errors.

== DNS management software comparison ==
Feature	NicTool	VegaDNS	mysqlBind	Webmin	Admin4	Microsoft DNS	SuaveDNS	Xname	dnsadmin	fmDNS	Micetro
Language	Perl & JS	PHP	C	Perl	Python	C	PHP & Perl	PHP & Perl	C	PHP & JS	C++
Database	MySQL	MySQL	MySQL	flat files	-	flat files or Active Directory	MySQL	MySQL	MySQL	MySQL	SQLite, MS SQL, PostgreSQL
Delegated Permissions	Yes	3 groups	Yes	No	No	No	No	No	No	Yes	Yes
Open Source	Yes	Yes	Yes	Yes	Yes	No	No	No	No	Yes	No
Latest Release	2017	2016	2016	2017	2016	2012	2003	2005	2003	2021	2021

== DNS server support ==
Name	NicTool	EfficientIP	VegaDNS	mysqlBind	Webmin	Admin4	Microsoft DNS Manager	fmDNS	Infoblox	Micetro
BIND	Yes	Yes	No	Yes	Yes	Yes	No	Yes	No	
tinydns	Yes	No	Yes	No	No	No	No	No	No	
PowerDNS	Yes	No	No	No	No	?	No	No	No	
MaraDNS	Yes	No	No	No	No	?	No	No	No	
NSD	Yes	Yes	No	No	No	?	No	No	No	
Microsoft; DNS Server	No	Yes	No	No	No	No	Yes	No	No	
Infoblox	No	No	No	No	No	No	No	No	Yes	
EfficientIP	No	Yes	No	No	No	No	Yes	No	Yes	

== BIND zone file format ==
The BIND zone file format is a widely used industry standard documented in RFC 1035. Several other DNS servers, including PowerDNS, NSD, Knot DNS, Microsoft DNS Server, and Micetro by MEn&Mice have the ability to read BIND zone files and serve from them.

== Resource record types supported ==
Name	NicTool	VegaDNS	mysqlBind	Webmin	Admin4	Microsoft DNS Manager	ProBIND	fmDNS	Micetro
A,NS,SOA,PTR	Yes	Yes	Yes	Yes	Yes	Yes	Yes	Yes	Yes
MX,TXT,CNAME	Yes	Yes	Yes	Yes	Yes	Yes	Yes	Yes	Yes
KEY	No	No	No	Yes	Yes	Yes	No	Yes	Yes
AAAA	Yes	Yes	Yes	Yes	Yes	Yes	No	Yes	Yes
LOC	Yes	No	No	Yes	Yes	No	No	No	Yes
SRV	Yes	Yes	Yes	Yes	Yes	Yes	Yes	Yes	Yes
NAPTR	Yes	No	Yes	No	Yes	Yes	No	Yes	Yes
SSHFP	Yes	No	No	No	Yes	No	No	Yes	Yes
RRSIG	Yes	No	No	No	Yes	Yes	No	No	Yes
NSEC	Yes	No	No	No	Yes	Yes	No	No	Yes
DNSKEY	Yes	No	No	No	Yes	Yes	No	Yes	Yes
DS	Yes	No	No	No	Yes	Yes	No	Yes	Yes
NSEC3	Yes	No	No	No	Yes	Yes	No	No	Yes
NSEC3PARAM	Yes	No	No	No	Yes	Yes	No	No	Yes
IPSECKEY	Yes	No	No	?	Yes	?	?	No	Yes
DNAME	Yes	No	No	?	Yes	Yes	?	Yes	Yes
SPF	Yes	No	No	Yes	Yes	No	No	Yes	Yes

- Microsoft DNS manager supports DNSSEC from Windows Server 2012 onwards. Some of the DNSSEC records can not be directly added but are generated during zone signing and managed as such.

== DNS software homogeneity ==
Primary reasons for DNS providers (especially root operators) to use different DNS servers is code diversity and application performance. Code diversity makes it less likely that a performance or security bug in one DNS server could be exploited to inflict a Denial of Service attack upon an organization. It is for this reason that NSD and Knot DNS are frequently used by root and TLD operators. DNS management software can greatly simplify publishing DNS data to varying DNS servers.

== See also ==
- Comparison of DNS server software
- IP address management (IP, DNS and DHCP Management systems)
- Nominum – DNS software company founded by Paul Mockapetris
- Secure64 – DNS management software.
- Ganymede – GPL licensed network directory management software that can manage DNS/DHCP.
- unxsVZ::unxsBind (was mysqlBind) – GPL Licensed DNS management software part of unxsVZ private cloud software suite.
