= MysqlBind =

DNS management software

mysqlBind/unxsBind is a DNS management software system. It supports Internet Systems Consortium BIND Domain Name System (DNS) and is distributed as open source software under the GNU General Public License.

mysqlBind/unxsBind has been in use since the late 1990s. It initially was designed to replace perl/bash based sets of maintenance scripts that made deployment and upkeep of large DNS systems time-consuming and prone to human error.

== Design ==
mysqlBind (now unxsBind) centralizes all data in a replicated SQL database and limits any DNS configuration errors to one software package failure point. unxsBind is a BIND9+ server management system only, not a DNS server, and generates DNS server specific configuration files so that the DNS server does not have to rely on a live SQL database. The unxsBind used SQL server is only needed to be operational for administration and deployment of new zones, new resource records, resource records changes and zone SOA changes. This non-reliance on a live SQL database has been a major point for reliable deployment of large scale DNS services.

unxsBind is based on a "Company/Organization-Contact-Role" login and permissions model, such that end user organization contacts can manage their own DNS data from a shared infrastructure. This unxsBind shared infrastructure supports an unlimited number of organizations that can then administrate their own DNS resources, such as IP blocks, zones and resource records. unxsBind provides for the centralized management of multiple independent name servers across data center boundaries.

The unxsBind system consists of a back end (unxsBind/iDNS) interface, and several example end user interfaces: The idnsAdmin admin interface, and the end user idnsOrg and vdnsOrg interfaces. All provided interfaces run on SQL originated HTML/CSS/JavaScript templates organized in types and sets for on the fly interface "skin" changes and new interfaces. This along with the backend/DNS-configuration-engine and front-end interface model used in unxsBind is meant to provide the DNS service provider with a simple path to provision their own custom interfaces with advanced functionality. For example, a DNS service provider branded AJAX based interface with punycode hostname conversion for IDNA support.

Secondary and master zones, secondary-only zones, forward zones, hidden masters and hidden external master zones are all supported. Recent versions allow unlimited split horizon configurations (multiple BIND 9.3+ views). NAPTR, AAAA, and many other complex resource records are supported with input validation and contextual glossary based help. Wizards are provided for error prone complex DNS configuration management operations, e.g. in-addr.arpa reverse dns NS delegation using CIDR and $GENERATE directives. LDAP login support is provided for the vdnsOrg interface.

A CentOS 5.2+ yum installable version is available. Advanced features such as HA and LDAP single sign-on require that the system be configured and installed from source.

== See also ==
- DNS hosting service
- Cluster manager
- DNSSEC - Latest versions of mysqlBind/iDNS support BIND 9.6 for easy DNSSEC-bis implementation and operations management.
