= Reduced pressure zone device =

Backflow prevention device

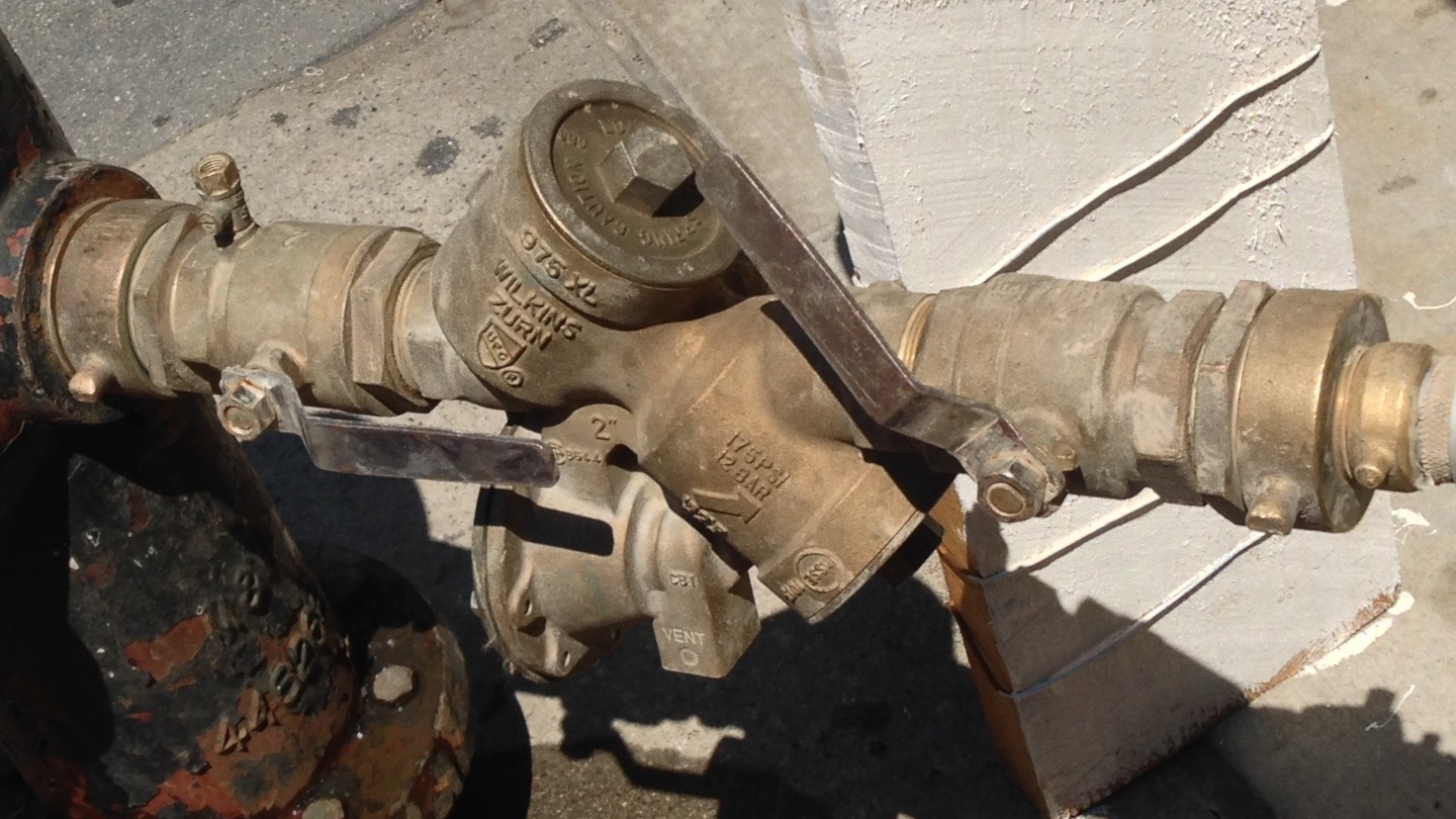
Reduced pressure zone device connected to a fire hydrant

A reduced pressure zone device (RPZD, RPZ, or RPZ valve) is a type of backflow prevention device used to protect water supplies from contamination. RPZDs may also be known as reduced pressure principle (RP), reduced pressure principle backflow prevention devices, reduced pressure zone assemblies (RPZA), or reduced pressure principle assembly (RPPA).

- ASSE Standard 1013 - Reduced Pressure Backflow Assembly
- ASSE Standard 1015 - Double Check Valve Assembly
- ASSE Standard 1020 - Pressure Vacuum Breaker
- ASSE Standard 1047 - Reduced Pressure Detector Assembly
- ASSE Standard 1047 - Reduced Pressure Detector Assembly Type II
- ASSE Standard 1048 - Double Check Detector Assembly
- ASSE Standard 1048 - Double Check Detector Assembly Type II
- ASSE Standard 1056 - Spill Resistant Vacuum Breaker

Backflow preventers are categorized into three groupings: Assembly, Device or Method. With the exception of elimination, these are the only ways one can control backflow from taking place.

The eight named backflow assemblies all have two resilient seated isolation/shut off valves with properly located test ports. These assemblies have the distinct advantage of being in-line serviceable and can be tested & repaired without having to remove an installed assembly. Special accredited courses are given to test & repair backflow assemblies and only certified testers may test backflow assemblies.

There are approximately fifteen devices related to backflow which cannot be tested, as they do not have isolation valves or test ports and there are no standards (test procedures) set in place to test for any device. This is what sets an assembly apart from a device. An assembly is testable, but a device is not.

Lastly, an air gap or barometric loop are methods to prevent backflow from taking place. These are also non-testable.

== Description ==
A RPZD is considered suitable for significant hazard applications, (Note: In the UK they are considered suitable for Category 4 'Significant hazard' e.g. antifreeze, but not Category 5 'Serious health risk', e.g. human waste) that is, where the consequence of backflow into the water supply would cause significant harm, although not for the highest risks, such as human waste. They are considered suitable because they prevent both back pressure and back-siphonage, because of a redundant design (even with two check valves broken the device still provides protection), and because they are testable to verify correct operation.

RPZDs are often chosen instead of an air gap since the head loss across the RPZD is much smaller.

The device consists of two independent check valves, plumbed in series, with a pressure monitored chamber between (also known as the zone). The chamber is maintained at a pressure that is lower than the water supply pressure, but high enough to be useful downstream. The reduced pressure is guaranteed by a differential pressure relief valve, which automatically relieves excess pressure in the chamber by discharging to a drain. Four test cocks are installed to allow an inspector to verify proper operation of the valve with a differential pressure meter. Two valves (one before and one after the RPZD) are provided to allow for testing and repair.

Facilities that require constant water pressure must install two RPZDs in parallel so that one device will be available to supply the facility while the other is tested or repaired.

Discharge from the relief device is an indication that either of the two check valves is 'passing' (leaking past their shutoff seats) or the relief valve itself is faulty. Some normal water use conditions may cause short episodes of discharge (this is why check one has a minimum passing value of relief +3. It is designed to handle the pressure fluctuations).

In the case of the upstream check valve passing, the differential pressure (higher supply pressure compared with the lower chamber pressure) causes any flow to occur only in one direction. A buildup of pressure in the chamber in such a case would be relieved to the drain.

In the case of the downstream check valve passing, the differential pressure relief valve prevents the possibility of the chamber pressure from exceeding the supply pressure.

It is theoretically possible that, when both valves are faulty, backflow could occur, should the reverse flow rate exceed the capacity of the relief valve.

Because certain combinations of check valve failure and/or system backpressure cause the relief valve to discharge, the device must be mounted in a location where the drain will not become flooded.

An example of where backflow would harm the water supply is the use of well washing devices inside underground sewerage pumping stations. At times untreated sewerage may contain a variety of harmful gases that will effectively break down and deteriorate concrete wells, hence well washers are utilised to spray water and wash down contaminated concrete walls of a well. All well washers are installed with RPZ Devices in case a pumping station breaks down, and the sewerage level rises above the well washer, causing backflow down the water supply line.

A reduced pressure zone device is tested with a device called a differential gauge. This gauge uses hoses attached to the various test cocks of the RPZD and checks to be certain that the check valve springs as well as the relief valve spring are not fouled and are working properly. There is a variety of manufacturers of these gauges, but most utilize either a three-valve or a five-valve design to test the RPZD in different ways.

In the UK, Illinois, New York, Texas, and Missouri(RsMO 10c60-11), the RPZD valve must be tested at least every 12 months by an accredited tester.

In the UK all RPZD Valve Testers have to be WRAS Accredited

== See also ==
- Air gap
- Atmospheric vacuum breaker
- Backflow prevention device
- Double check valve
