= Networks and States =

2010 book by Milton L. Muller

- Original cover
- Author: Milton L. Muller
- Language: English
- Genre: Non-fiction
- Publication date: 2010
- Publication place: United States
- Media type: Print (Hardcover and Paperback)

Networks and States: The Global Politics of Internet Governance is a 2010 book by Professor at the Syracuse University School of Information Studies Milton L. Muller. This book shows an influence of networks on the government.

== Synopsis ==
- Chapter I, Networks and Governance
- Chapter II, Transnational Institutions
- Chapter III, Drivers of Internet Governance
