= NLnet Labs =

Dutch network research laboratory

NLnet Labs is a Dutch network research laboratory in Amsterdam, founded in 1999 by the board members of NLnet. NLnet Labs develops DNS-related software, such as NSD, Unbound, Cascade as well as BGP related tooling such as Rotonda and Krill.

== History ==
NLnet Labs originated from the NLnet Foundation. NLnet's core business is to support independent organisations and people that contribute to an open information society. For long term research projects, NLnet Labs was founded in 1999 by the board members of NLnet and Ted Lindgreen. One of the first activities was creating an implementation for DNSSEC. In 2001 the RIPE NCC asked NLnet Labs to write a DNS implementation geared especially to rootservers, but not containing any code of existing software. This marked the start of the development of NSD, the authoritative nameserver package.

Other major projects include a validating caching resolver Unbound, and the Routinator project.

On 19 April 2023, NLnet Labs and the Internet Systems Consortium (ISC) sent a joint letter to the European Parliament committee working on the EU Cyber Resilience Act. The letter is a plea for fairness for non-profit developers of open-source software, because the Act mostly focuses on those who supply products in a business related context, while according to the two organisations the non-profit distribution of open source internet infrastructure software should not be regarded as a "commercial activity".
