= EDNS Client Subnet =

Option in Extension Mechanisms for DNS

EDNS Client Subnet (ECS) is an option in the Extension Mechanisms for DNS that allows a recursive DNS resolver to specify the subnetwork for the host or client on whose behalf it is making a DNS query. This is generally intended to help speed up the delivery of data from content delivery networks (CDNs), by allowing better use of DNS-based load balancing to select a service address near the client when the client computer is not necessarily near the recursive resolver.

When an authoritative name server receives a DNS query, it takes advantage of ECS DNS extension to resolve the hostname to a CDN which is geolocated near to the client IP's subnet, hence the client makes further requests to a nearby CDN, thereby reducing latency. The EDNS client subnet mechanism is specified in RFC 7871.

== Privacy and security implications ==
Because ECS provides client network information to the upstream authoritative DNS server, the extension reveals some information about the client's location that the authoritative DNS server would not otherwise be able to deduce. The same client network information also becomes available to transit networks between the client's recursive and the domain's authoritative server. Security researchers have suggested that ECS could be used to conduct internet surveillance. ECS may also be exploited to perform selective DNS cache poisoning attacks intended to only re-route specific clients to a poisoned DNS record.

== Allowlisting ==
CDN company Akamai configures its authoritative DNS servers to ignore ECS by default. Only queries from allowlisted resolvers receive responses incorporating client subnet information. Membership in the allowlist is determined by a business agreement, and currently includes Cisco OpenDNS and Google Public DNS.

The Cisco OpenDNS recursive resolver only forwards ECS to authoritative servers that it has placed on an allowlist. Authoritative DNS providers must contact OpenDNS to include their servers by hostname.

== Controversy over lack of support ==
The owner of self-serve web archiving tool Archive.today has expressed concern over Cloudflare 1.1.1.1 not passing the contents of this field on to the authoritative DNS server for Archive.today, and has in response configured the site's authoritative DNS servers to consider Cloudflare DNS requests invalid—effectively blocking 1.1.1.1 from resolving the website DNS records.

The owner of the site believes 1.1.1.1 too often routes recursive DNS requests in a non-geographically-optimal way, causing poorer connectivity than if the feature was available at all times.

Cloudflare CEO Matthew Prince cited privacy concerns as reason for 1.1.1.1 to not support ECS.
