= List of commercial open-source applications and services =

This is a list of notable commercial open-source applications, adopting business models for open-source software, alphabetized by the product/service name.

Product or service name	Commercial vendor	Description	Current version	Open source Project name	Ver 1.0 Date
389 Directory Server	Red Hat	LDAP-compliant directory server	1.4.0	Fedora Directory Server	2005
Abiquo	Abiquo	Cloud management	4.5	Abiquo	2008
AdaControl	Adalog	Source-code controller and coding standard checker for Ada	1.13r8	AdaControl	2004
Anaconda Distribution	Anaconda	Package management tool and distribution	4.12	Conda (package manager)	2022
Airflow	Astronomer	Workflow management platform.	1.10.5	Apache Airflow	2015
Alfresco	Alfresco	Enterprise content management, web content management	2.2	Alfresco	2006
APISIX	API7.ai	Cloud-native API gateway	3.0	Apache APISIX	2019
Asterisk	Digium	PBX server / telephony toolkit	16.5	Asterisk	2004
Atlas	Ariga	Database Schemas As Code	0.34.0	Atlas	2021
Bacula	Bacula	Data backup/recovery	9.4.4	Bacula	2000
Berkeley DB	Oracle Corporation	DBMS engines	18.1	Berkeley DB Core	1994
BIND 9	Internet Systems Consortium	Authoritative/recursive DNS software	9.16.10	BIND 9	2000
Bonita BPM	Bonitasoft	Business process management suite	7.9	Bonita BPM	2001
Bytebase	Bytebase	Database DevOps	2.23.0	Bytebase	2021
Cassandra	Datastax	NoSQL database	3.11.4	Apache Cassandra	2008
Chef	Chef	Configuration management tool	14.10.9	Chef	2009
Cloud Foundry	Pivotal	Multi-Cloud platform	11.1.0	Cloud Foundry	2011
Collabora Online	Collabora Productivity	Online Office Suite and apps	26.04.4.3	Collabora Online	2016
Compiere	Compiere	ERP and CRM	3.3	Compiere	2000?
Consul	Hashicorp	Service discovery	1.4.2	Consul	2014
CruiseControl	ThoughtWorks	Software development tools	2.8.4	CruiseControl	2007
DaDaBIK	Eugenio Tacchini	Database front-end applications generator	9.4	DaDaBIK	2001
db4o	db4o	ODBMS	8.0	db4o	?
Docker	Docker	Container	19.3.1	Docker	2013
Dolibarr	Dolibarr Association	ERP and CRM	10.0.0	Dolibarr ERP CRM	2003
Drupal	Acquia	Web Content Management System	8.6.17	Drupal	2000
Easy Redmine	Easy Software	Project management software	13.3.0	Redmine	2007
Entrance	dbEntrance Software	SQL-based data exploration tool	1.3.34	Entrance Community	2007
Ext JS	Sencha	Cross-browser JavaScript framework	6.7.0	Ext JS	2007
EyeOS	EyeOS	Cloud-computing operating system	2.1beta	EyeOS	2007
Firefox	Mozilla Corporation	Web Browser	68.0.2	Firefox	2002
FireCMS	Firecms S.L.	CMS	3.0	FireCMS	2020
Fluentd	Treasure Data	Logging and data collection	1.3		2011
ForgeRock	ForgeRock	Identity and access management	2.1.2	ForgeRock	2010
Fuse Message Broker	Progress Software	JMS platform	6	Apache ActiveMQ	2006
FUSE ESB	Progress Software	Enterprise service bus	7.4.0	Apache ServiceMix	2006
FUSE Mediation Router	Progress Software	Routing and process mediation engine	2.6	Apache Camel	2006
FUSE Services Framework	Progress Software	JAX-WS 2.0 service-enablement framework	2.3	Apache CXF	2006
GitLab	GitLab Inc.	Version control	2.23.0	GitLab Community Edition	2005
GNAT Pro	AdaCore	Ada compiler	9.2	GNAT	1995
Hadoop	Cloudera, Hortonworks, MapR	Distributed system for big data management	3.2.0	Apache Hadoop	2006
HAProxy	HAProxy Technologies LLC, HAProxy Technologies SASU	High availability load balancer	3.1	HAProxy	2000
Hazelcast	Hazelcast	In-Memory Data Grid	4.2	Hazelcast	2008
InfluxDB	InfluxData	Timeseries DBMS	1.7.6	InfluxDB	2013
Ingres Database	Ingres	RDBMS	11.0	Ingres	?
IntelliJ	JetBrains	Software development tools	2019.2	IntelliJ	2001
ISC DHCP	Internet Systems Consortium	DHCP client/server/relay software	4.4.2	ISC DHCP	1999
Java Enterprise System	Oracle Corporation	Application server, middleware, LDAP, etc.	8	Java	2003?
JBoss Enterprise Middleware	Red Hat	Enterprise middleware based on Java Platform, Enterprise Edition	7.2	JBoss	2001
Joget Workflow	Open Dynamics	Workflow, Business process management, RAD	6.0.2	Joget Workflow	2009
Jumper 2.0	Jumper Networks	Universal search tool powered by enterprise social bookmarking	2.0.1.9	Project Jumper	2008
Kafka	Confluent	Data streaming processing	2.3.0	Apache Kafka	2011
Kaltura	Kaltura	Video and rich media management platform and applications dual-licensed under AGPL, and commercial license, provided as self hosted and SaaS	6.0 (Falcon)	Kaltura	2012
Kea DHCP	Internet Systems Consortium	DHCPv4 and DHCPv6 server software	1.8.2	Kea DHCP	2014
Liferay Portal	Liferay	Enterprise web portal	5.0.1	Liferay Portal	2000?
LogicalDOC	Logical Objects Srl	Document Management System	8.3.2	LogicalDOC document management – DMS	2004
Lotus Symphony	IBM	Office productivity suite	3.0.1	Eclipse, OpenOffice	2007
LucidWorks	Lucid Imagination	Open Source Search Platform	8.2.0	Apache Lucene / Solr	1999
Magento Open Source	Magento	eCommerce	2.3.2	Magento	2008
MapBox	MapBox	Mapping software		MapBox	2010?
MariaDB	MariaDB Corporation	RDBMS	10.4.7	MariaDB	2008
MongoDB	MongoDB Inc.	Document Store DBMS	4.0.10	MongoDB	2009
Mono	Novell (now Xamarin)	Open source implementation of Microsoft's .NET application framework	6.0.0	Mono	2004
Mule	MuleSoft	Enterprise service bus and integration platform	3.9.0	Mule	2003
MySQL Enterprise	Oracle Corporation	RDBMS	8.0.17	MySQL Community	1995
Neo4j	Neo4j	Graph DBMS	3.5.8	Neo4j	2007
NetBeans	Oracle Corporation	Software development tools (Java, Ruby, Perl, PHP, etc.)	11.1	NetBeans	2000
Odoo	Odoo S.A.	ERP, CMS/Ecommerce	19.2	Odoo	2005
Openbravo	Openbravo	ERP	2.33	Openbravo ERP	2001
OpenSearchServer	OpenSearchServer	Enterprise Search	1.2	OpenSearchServer	2009
Openshift	Red Hat	Multi-Cloud platform	4.6	OKD	2012
Open vSwitch	Nicira	Software Defined Network	2.11.1	Open vSwitch	2009
OpenStack	Mirantis	Infrastructure		OpenStack	2010
Open CASCADE Technology	Open Cascade SAS	Software library for 3D CAD / CAM / CAE applications	7.3	Open CASCADE Technology	1999
Open Workbench	Computer Associates	Project management / governance tools	1.1.6	Open Workbench	2004
OrangeHRM	OrangeHRM	HR management	2.6.6	Orange HRM	2006
Palo Business Intelligence Suite	Jedox AG	Palo is an open-source BI solution for corporate performance management and OLAP-based planning, analysis, consolidation and reporting.	2018.1	Jedox AG	2002
Pentaho Business Intelligence Suite	Pentaho	Business intelligence, data mining, data integration, analytics, reporting, and dashboards	8.2	Pentaho Open BI Suite	2004
Poseidon for UML	Gentleware	Software modeling tool	8.0	ArgoUML	1998
Project.net	Project.net	Project and portfolio management	9.3	projectnet	2000
Puppet	Puppet Labs	Infrastructure configuration management	6.0.4	Puppet	2005
Qt	Trolltech	GUI development toolkit	5.13	Qt	1995
Rational Application Developer	IBM	Software development tools	4.12	Eclipse	2001
Red Hat Enterprise Linux	Red Hat	Enterprise server and client Linux distribution	5.2.10	Linux	1991
Saleor	Saleor Commerce	Enterprise ecommerce	3.0	Saleor	2012
ScyllaDB	ScyllaDB	NoSQL database	5.4	ScyllaDB Open Source	2014
Sencha Touch	Sencha	HTML5 mobile app framework	2.4.2	Sencha Touch	2010
SilverStripe	SilverStripe	Enterprise CMS and development framework	4.4.3	SilverStripe	2008
Snare	InterSect Alliance	Log collection and analysis	4.0	Snare	2001
Shelf	Shelf Asset Management, Inc	Asset Management Software / Equipment Scheduling	1.11.4	Shelf.nu	2023
Snort	Sourcefire	Network Intrusion Detection	3.0	Snort	1998
Solaris	Oracle Corporation	Operating system	11.4	OpenSolaris	1992
Sourcegraph	Sourcegraph	Software_intelligence	5.7	Sourcegraph	2013
Spark	Databricks	Data analytics framework	2.4.3	Apache Spark	2014
Spring Framework	SpringSource	Software development framework	5.1.9	Spring	2002
Squiz	Squiz.net	Enterprise content management system	v4.8.2 (PHP5)	Squiz Matrix	1998
StarOffice	Oracle Corporation	Office productivity suite	8.0	OpenOffice.org	2000
Sun Studio	Oracle Corporation	Software development tools for C, C++	12.6	NetBeans	2000
SUSE Linux Enterprise Server	SUSE	Enterprise server and client Linux distribution	12	openSUSE	2005
Terraform	Hashicorp	Infrastructure orchestration and management	0.12.7	Terraform	2014
TerminusDB	TerminusDB	Document store and graph database	10.0.3	TerminusDB	2019
TiDB	PingCAP	NewSQL distributed database	8.5.3	TiDB	2017
Websphere	IBM	Web server, application server, middleware			1998
Ubuntu	Canonical	Linux distribution	19.04	Ubuntu	2004
Univention Corporate Server	Univention GmbH	Server operating system	5.0-0	Univention Corporate Server	2004
Unreal Engine	Epic Games	Open source game engine written in C++	4.22.3	Unreal Engine	1998
Varnish	Fastly	Web accelerator	6.2.0	Varnish cache	2006
Vyatta	Vyatta	Router, firewall, VPN	VC3	Vyatta Community	2006
Webix	XB Software	Cross-platform JavaScript Framework	6.4.0	Webix	2013
Wordpress	Automattic, WP Engine	Web content management system	5.2.2	Wordpress	2003
WooCommerce	Mike Jolley, James Koster	e-commerce plugin for WordPress.	7.7.0		2011
Zarafa	Zarafa	Email and calendaring solution	7.2.5	Zarafa opensource edition	2005
YugabyteDB	Yugabyte	NewSQL DBMS	2.8	YugabyteDB	2019
Zenoss Core	Zenoss	Application, network, and systems management	6.2.1	Zenoss Core	2006
Zmanda	Zmanda	File / dbms backup and recovery	2.6.1	Zmanda Community Edition	2005
Zope	Zope	Content management system and web portal	2.10.5	zope.org	1999
