= Comparison of DHCP server software =

The following comparison of DHCP and DHCPv6 server compares general and technical information for several DHCP server software programs.

== General ==
Name	Author	First public release	Latest stable version	Cost	Software license	Written in
dhcpy6d	Henri Wahl	2012	1.6.0 27 July 2024; 21 months ago	free software	GPLv2	Python
dnsmasq	Simon Kelley	2001	2.92 (January 14, 2026; 3 months ago) [±]	free software	GPLv2 or GPLv3	C
ISC DHCP	Internet Systems Consortium	1999	Extended Support Version: 4.1-ESV-R16-P1 (May 26, 2021; 4 years ago) [±] Current-stable: 4.4.3-P1 (EOL December 2022) (October 5, 2022; 3 years ago) [±] This software has reached EOL! Superseded by Kea (see below)	free software	ISC MPL 2.0 for ver 4.4.x	C
FreeRADIUS	FreeRADIUS Development Team	2012 (First stable release including DHCPv4 support)	FreeRADIUS 3.2.8 (August 20, 2025; 8 months ago) [±]	free software	GPLv2	C
Kea DHCP	Internet Systems Consortium	2014	Kea 3.0.3 (March 25, 2026; 46 days ago)	free software	MPL 2.0	C++
udhcpd	Matthew Ramsay	1999	busybox 1.36.1 (May 19, 2023; 2 years ago) [±]	free software	GNU GPLv2 only	C

== Operating system requirement ==
In this overview of operating system support for the discussed DHCP server, the following terms indicate the level of support:

- No indicates that it does not exist or was never released.
- Yes indicates that it has been officially released in a fully functional, stable version.

This compilation is not exhaustive, but rather reflects the most common platforms today.

Server	BSD	Solaris	Linux	macOS	Windows
dhcpy6d	Yes	No	Yes	Yes	No
dnsmasq	Yes	No	Yes	Yes	No
ISC DHCP	Yes	Yes	Yes	No	No
FreeRADIUS	Yes	Yes	Yes	Yes	No
Kea DHCP	Yes	No	Yes	Yes	No
udhcpd	Yes	Yes	Yes	Yes	No

== Feature matrix ==
Server	BOOTP	DHCP	DHCPv6	Other	Load balancing	Failover
dhcpy6d	No	No	Yes	PXE, Dynamic DNS	Yes	Yes
dnsmasq	Yes	Yes	Yes	PXE, TFTP	No	No
ISC DHCP	Yes	Yes	Yes	Dynamic DNS	Yes	Yes
Kea	Yes	Yes	Yes	Dynamic DNS	Yes	Yes
FreeRADIUS	No	Yes	Yes	RADIUS, VMPS	Yes	Yes
udhcpd	Yes	Yes	No	?	?	?

== See also ==
- Comparison of DNS server software
