= WPAP =

WPAP may refer to:

- Web Proxy Autodiscovery Protocol
- WPAP (FM), a radio station (92.5 FM) licensed to Panama City, Florida, United States
