= DHCPD =

DHCP server program that operates as a daemon

ISC DHCP
- Original author(s): Ted Lemon
- Developer(s): Internet Systems Consortium
- Initial release: 1999; 26 years ago
- Final release: 4.4.3-P1 / October, 2022
- Repository: https://gitlab.isc.org/isc-projects/dhcp
- Written in: C
- Operating system: BSD, Linux, Solaris
- Type: DHCP server
- License: ISC License, MPL2.0
- Website: www.isc.org/dhcp/
- As of: 5 2023

dhcpd (an abbreviation for "DHCP daemon") was a DHCP server program that operates as a daemon on a server to provide Dynamic Host Configuration Protocol (DHCP) service to a network. This implementation, also known as ISC DHCP, is one of the first and best known, but there are now a number of other DHCP server software implementations available.

Clients may solicit an IP address from a DHCP server when they need one. The DHCP server then offers the "lease" of an IP address to the client, which the client is free to request or ignore. If the client requests it and the server acknowledges it, then the client is permitted to use that IP address for the "lease time" specified by the server. At some point before the lease expires, the client must re-request the same IP address if it wishes to continue to use it.

Issued IP addresses are tracked by dhcpd through a record in the dhcpd.leases file. This allows the server to maintain state over restarts of the dhcp service, which could otherwise lead to duplicate IP addresses being issued when server issued the same IP address again while another client still has the right to use it.

This reference implementation of DHCP is developed by the Internet Systems Consortium and is supported on Linux, Mac OS X, FreeBSD, and Solaris.

Remote access to a running instance of dhcpd is provided by the Object Management Application Programming Interface (OMAPI). This API allows manipulation of the internal state of a running instance of the dhcpd server or client. On the server side, this interface allows editing of registration information for managed nodes. Uses on the client include fetching configuration information, releasing and renewing leases, and changing which interfaces are managed by the DHCP client.

ISC DHCP was declared End-of-Life in October, 2022. ISC is developing a new DHCP software system, which is intended to eventually replace it. This software, Kea, includes a DHCP server only (so, no client or relay yet) and is supported on the same platforms as ISC DHCP. It is distributed under the Mozilla Public License (MPL2.0).

ISC DHCP adopted the Mozilla Public License (MPL2.0) with the release of 4.4.1.

== See also ==
- Comparison of DHCP server software
