= Distinguisher =

Distinguisher may refer to:

- Route distinguisher, an address qualifier used to distinguish Virtual Private Network (VPN) routes
- Distinguishing attack, a cryptographic attack that distinguishes a ciphertext from truly random data
