= DHCP snooping =

Techniques to secure DHCP service

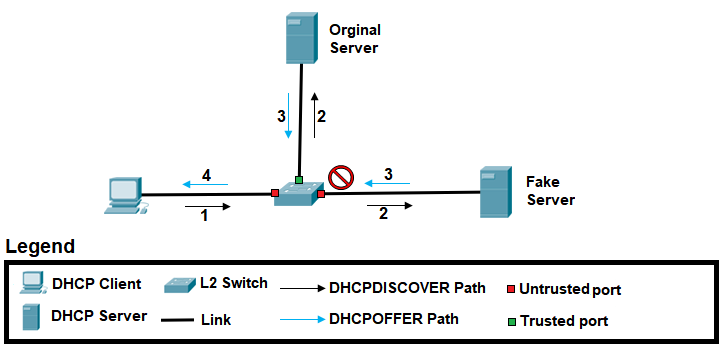
Example showing how DHCP snooping works

In computer networking, DHCP snooping is a series of techniques applied to improve the security of a Dynamic Host Configuration Protocol (DHCP) infrastructure.

== Techniques ==
DHCP servers allocate IP addresses to clients on a LAN. DHCP snooping can be configured on LAN switches to exclude rogue DHCP servers and remove malicious or malformed DHCP traffic. In addition, information on hosts which have successfully completed a DHCP transaction is accrued in a database of bindings which may then be used by other security or accounting features.

Other features may use DHCP snooping database information to ensure IP integrity on a Layer 2 switched domain. This information enables a network to:

- Track the physical location of IP addresses when combined with AAA accounting or SNMP.
- Ensure that hosts only use the IP addresses assigned to them when combined with source-guard; a.k.a. source-lockdown
- Sanitize ARP requests when combined with arp-inspection; a.k.a. arp-protect
