= Search domain =

DNS feature

A search domain is a domain used as part of a domain search list. The search list, as well as the local domain name, is used by a resolver to create a fully qualified domain name (FQDN) from a relative name. For this purpose, the local domain name functions as a single-item search list.

== IPv4 ==
In an IPv4 environment, search domains are often set via DHCPv4, along with the local domain name. The domain search list is configured by the Domain Search Option (DHCPv4 option number 119), while the local domain name is configured by Domain Name (DHCPv4 option number 15).

The Windows operating system, however, understands the Domain Search Option only since Windows 10 April 2018 Update. As a workaround for previous versions, many network administrators use Group Policy Objects to set the domain search list for Windows machines.

== IPv6 ==
In an IPv6 environment, the domain search list is called a DNS Search List (DNSSL) and can be configured by Router Advertisement and DHCP.

== Manually configuring domain search lists ==
In CentOS Linux search domain can be defined by editing the ifcfg file corresponding to the network. In Mac OS X the setting is located under the DNS tab, next to DNS server settings. A similar setting in Microsoft Windows is the Connection-specific DNS Suffix.

== Functionality ==
When looking up a bare name in DNS, the network stack will add the search domains to it to form fully qualified domain names, and look up those as well. For example, if the domain search list contains "wikipedia.org", typing "en" in the browser will direct the user to "en.wikipedia.org". Some Internet service providers add their own search domains via DHCP settings, similar to how they add DNS servers and other networking information; if this is undesired, the user can change this setting to ".internal" or a Top level domain.

== See also ==
- Domain Name System
- DHCP Options
