= ISC license =

Permissive free software license

- Publisher: Internet Systems Consortium
- SPDX identifier: ISC
- Debian FSG compatible: Yes
- FSF approved: Yes
- OSI approved: Yes
- GPL compatible: Yes
- Copyleft: No
- Linking from code with a different license: Yes
- Website: www.isc.org/licenses/

The ISC license is a permissive free software license published by the Internet Software Consortium, now called Internet Systems Consortium (ISC). It is functionally equivalent to the simplified BSD and MIT licenses, but without language deemed unnecessary following the Berne Convention. (Note: "The ISC copyright is functionally equivalent to a two-term BSD copyright with language removed that is made unnecessary by the Berne convention.") (Note: "In OpenBSD we use an ISC-style copyright text [...] that is enough to satisfy every legal system on the planet which follows the Berne Convention.")

Originally used for ISC software such as BIND and dig, it has become the preferred license for contributions to OpenBSD and the default license for npm packages. The ISC license is also used for Linux wireless drivers contributed by Qualcomm Atheros, as well as by the LV2 plugin system.

== License terms ==
ISC License

Copyright <YEAR> <OWNER>

Permission to use, copy, modify, and/or distribute this software for any purpose with or without fee is hereby granted, provided that the above copyright notice and this permission notice appear in all copies.

THE SOFTWARE IS PROVIDED "AS IS" AND THE AUTHOR DISCLAIMS ALL WARRANTIES WITH REGARD TO THIS SOFTWARE INCLUDING ALL IMPLIED WARRANTIES OF MERCHANTABILITY AND FITNESS. IN NO EVENT SHALL THE AUTHOR BE LIABLE FOR ANY SPECIAL, DIRECT, INDIRECT, OR CONSEQUENTIAL DAMAGES OR ANY DAMAGES WHATSOEVER RESULTING FROM LOSS OF USE, DATA OR PROFITS, WHETHER IN AN ACTION OF CONTRACT, NEGLIGENCE OR OTHER TORTIOUS ACTION, ARISING OUT OF OR IN CONNECTION WITH THE USE OR PERFORMANCE OF THIS SOFTWARE.

—

When initially released, the license did not include the term "and/or", which was changed from "and" by ISC in 2007. Paul Vixie stated on the BIND mailing list that the ISC license started using the term "and/or" to avoid controversy similar to the events surrounding the University of Washington's refusal to allow distribution of the Pine email software. Both versions of the license are compatible with the GNU GPL.

== OpenBSD license ==
The OpenBSD project began using the ISC license in 2003, before the 2007 addition of the term "and/or" to the license.

Copyright (c) YYYY YOUR-NAME-HERE <user@your.dom.ain>

Permission to use, copy, modify, and distribute this software for any
purpose with or without fee is hereby granted, provided that the above
copyright notice and this permission notice appear in all copies.

THE SOFTWARE IS PROVIDED "AS IS" AND THE AUTHOR DISCLAIMS ALL WARRANTIES
WITH REGARD TO THIS SOFTWARE INCLUDING ALL IMPLIED WARRANTIES OF
MERCHANTABILITY AND FITNESS. IN NO EVENT SHALL THE AUTHOR BE LIABLE FOR
ANY SPECIAL, DIRECT, INDIRECT, OR CONSEQUENTIAL DAMAGES OR ANY DAMAGES
WHATSOEVER RESULTING FROM LOSS OF USE, DATA OR PROFITS, WHETHER IN AN
ACTION OF CONTRACT, NEGLIGENCE OR OTHER TORTIOUS ACTION, ARISING OUT OF
OR IN CONNECTION WITH THE USE OR PERFORMANCE OF THIS SOFTWARE.

—

Theo de Raadt of OpenBSD chose to retain the original wording, stating that he "disagrees with what ISC did" and is "not confident that their change is good" because "some country's legal systems might not understand 'and/or' in the way the old 'or' was used in the sentence".

== Reception ==
In 2015, ISC announced they would release their Kea DHCP Software under the Mozilla Public License 2.0, stating, "There is no longer a good reason for ISC to have its own license, separate from everything else". They also preferred a copyleft license, stating, "If a company uses our software but improves it, we really want those improvements to go back into the master source". Throughout the following years, they re-licensed all ISC-hosted software, including BIND in 2016 and ISC DHCP Server in 2017.

The Publications Office of the European Union advises using the MIT license instead of the ISC License in order to reduce license proliferation.

Despite there being no case law backing up the position that "comma and distribute" is ambiguous, the GNU project states the inclusion of "and/or" still allows the license to be interpreted as prohibiting distribution of modified versions. Although they state there is no reason to avoid software released under this license, they advise against using the license to keep the problematic language from causing trouble in the future.

== See also ==
- Comparison of free and open-source software licenses
- Software using the ISC license
