= Prefix delegation =

Method of delegation of routing prefixes automatically in IPv6

IP networks are divided logically into subnetworks. Computers in the same subnetwork have the same address prefix. For example, in a typical home network with legacy Internet Protocol version 4, the network prefix would be something like 192.168.1.0/24, as expressed in CIDR notation.

With IPv4, commonly home networks use private addresses (defined in RFC 1918) that are non-routable on the public Internet and use address translation to convert to routable addresses when connecting to hosts outside the local network. Business networks typically had manually provisioned subnetwork prefixes. In IPv6 global addresses are used end-to-end, so even home networks may need to distribute public, routable IP addresses to hosts.

Since it would not be practical to manually provision networks at scale, in IPv6 networking, DHCPv6 prefix delegation (RFC 3633; RFC 8415 § 6.3) is used to assign a network address prefix and automate configuration and provisioning of the public routable addresses for the network. In the typical case of a home network, for example, the home router uses DHCPv6 to request a network prefix from the ISP's DHCPv6 server. Once assigned, the ISP routes this network to the customer's home router and the home router starts advertising the new address space to hosts on the network, either via SLAAC or using DHCPv6.

DHCPv6 Prefix Delegation is supported by most ISPs who provide native IPv6 for consumers on fixed networks.

Prefix delegation is generally not supported on cellular networks, for example LTE or 5G. Most cellular networks route a fixed /64 prefix to the subscriber. Personal hotspots may still provide IPv6 access to hosts on the network by using a different technique called Proxy Neighbor Discovery or using the technique described in RFC 7278. One of the reasons why cellular networks may not yet support prefix delegation is that the operators want to use prefixes they can aggregate to a single route. To solve this, RFC 6603 defines an optional mechanism and the related DHCPv6 option to allow exclusion of one specific prefix from a delegated prefix set.
