= Kea (software) =

Open-source DHCP server

ISC Kea
- Original authors: Tomek Mrugalski and Marcin Siodelski
- Developer: Internet Systems Consortium
- Initial release: 2014; 12 years ago
- Written in: C++
- Operating system: BSD, Linux, macOS
- Type: DHCP server
- License: MPL 2.0
- Website: www.isc.org/kea/
- Repository: gitlab.isc.org/isc-projects/kea

Kea is an open-source DHCP server developed by the Internet Systems Consortium, authors of ISC DHCP, also known as DHCPd. Kea and ISC DHCP are both implementations of the Dynamic Host Configuration Protocol (DHCP), a set of standards established by the Internet Engineering Task Force (IETF) to automatically assign IP addresses. Kea software is distributed in source code form on ISC's website, and both the source code and a variety of different OS packages are available on Cloudsmith. Kea is licensed under the Mozilla Public License 2.0.

The Kea distribution includes a DHCPv4 server, a DHCPv6 server, and a Dynamic DNS (DDNS) server. Significant features include: support for IPv6 prefix delegation, host reservations (which may be optionally stored in a separate back end database), Preboot Execution Environment (PXE) boot, client classification, shared networks, and high-availability (failover pairs). Kea can store leases locally in a memfile, or in a PostgreSQL or MySQL database. Kea has a supported API for writing optional extensions, using 'hooks'.

The release of Kea 3.0.0 in June 2025 marked the first Long-Term Support version of the Kea DHCP software, meant to be supported for three years.

Kea has a graphical management application, called Stork, that integrates an agent running on the Kea server, an exporter to a Prometheus time-series data store, a Grafana template for data visualization, and the Stork web dashboard. Like Kea, Stork is licensed under the MPL 2.0 license. The Stork dashboard provides a simple graphical display for managing one or many Kea servers. Current features include server status, pool utilization, high-availability status, host reservations, and leases per second. Via the integration with Grafana it also provides detailed statistics on DHCP messages over time. Stork was first released in 2014, and features are being added rapidly in monthly releases.
