= Rogue DHCP =

DHCP server running on an outside network

A rogue DHCP server is a DHCP server on a network which is not under the administrative control of the network staff. It is a network device such as a modem or a router connected to the network by a user who may be either unaware of the consequences of their actions or may be knowingly using it for network attacks such as man in the middle. Some kind of computer viruses or malicious software have been found to set up a rogue DHCP, especially for those classified in the category.

As clients connect to the network, both the rogue and legal DHCP server will offer them IP addresses as well as default gateway, DNS servers, WINS servers, among others. If the information provided by the rogue DHCP differs from the real one, clients accepting IP addresses from it may experience network access problems, including speed issues as well as inability to reach other hosts because of incorrect IP network or gateway. In addition, if a rogue DHCP is set to provide as default gateway an IP address of a machine controlled by a misbehaving user, it can sniff all the traffic sent by the clients to other networks, violating network security policies as well as user privacy (see man in the middle). VMware or virtual machine software can also act as a rogue DHCP server inadvertently when being run on a client machine joined to a network. The VMware will act as a rogue DHCP server handing out random IP addresses to the clients around it on the network. The result can be that large portions of the network are then cut off from both the Internet and the rest of the domain without any access at all.

== Mitigation ==
Rogue DHCP servers can be stopped by means of intrusion detection systems with appropriate signatures, as well as by some multilayer switches, which can be configured to drop the packets. One of the most common methods to deal with rogue DHCP servers is called DHCP snooping, which drops DHCP messages from untrusted DHCP servers.
