= DHCPv6 =

Protocol for statefully assigning IPv6 addresses on an IPv6 network

Dynamic Host Configuration Protocol version 6
- Communication protocol
- Abbreviation: DHCPv6
- Purpose: Provide IPv6 addresses and additional network configuration parameters to clients in an IPv6 network.
- Developers: Michael Carney; Charles E. Perkins; Bernie Volz; Ted Lemon; Jim Bound
- Introduction: June 2003; 23 years ago
- Based on: Dynamic Host Configuration Protocol for IPv4
- OSI layer: Layer 7 Application
- Ports: UDP port 546, for Clients. UDP port 547, for Servers and relay agents.
- RFCs: 9915, 8415, 3319, 3646, 4704, 5007, 6355, 6939, 7653

The Dynamic Host Configuration Protocol version 6 (DHCPv6) is a network protocol for configuring Internet Protocol version 6 (IPv6) hosts with IP addresses, IP prefixes, and other configuration data required to operate in an IPv6 network. It is not just the IPv6 equivalent of the Dynamic Host Configuration Protocol for IPv4.

IPv6 hosts may automatically generate IP addresses internally using stateless address autoconfiguration (SLAAC), or they may be assigned configuration data with DHCPv6, or both.

DHCPv6 and SLAAC are complementary services. Unlike the Neighbor Discovery Protocol (NDP) used by SLAAC, DHCPv6 can not only assign single unicast addresses, but also entire prefixes in prefix delegation. For example, an ISP's router can provide a prefix to a customer's router via DHCPv6 so that the customer's router can assign addresses to the customer's many devices via either DHCPv6 or SLAAC. This allows routers for residential networks to be configured with no operator intervention.

DHCPv6 also allows the distribution of information other than what SLAAC/NDP provides on a given network: this works even without DHCPv6 managing the distribution of network addresses. The standard method for a SLAAC/NDP network to hand out Domain Name System (DNS) server settings is via setting a flag in the Router Advertisement (RA) message telling the clients to ask for such settings over DHCPv6, although this specific use case is being replaced via a nonstandard extension of the RA message. Still, there remains a plethora of DHCPv6 options for providing additional information not handled by SLAAC/NDP, much like the wide range of information conveyed by legacy DHCP options.

Finally, DHCPv6 also offers a stateful approach, which provides more control than SLAAC's stateless approach.

== Operation ==
=== Multicast addresses in DHCPv6 ===
DHCPv6 uses IPv6 multicast addresses to enable communication between clients, relay agents, and servers when unicast addresses are not yet known. RFC 9915 defines two well-known multicast groups for this purpose.

==== Defined multicast addresses ====
Multicast address	Name	Scope	Used by	Purpose
ff02::1:2	All_DHCP_Relay_Agents_and_Servers	Link-local	Clients	Discover on-link DHCPv6 servers and relay agents
ff05::1:3	All_DHCP_Servers	Site-local	Relay agents	Forward client messages to all DHCPv6 servers within a site

All DHCPv6 servers and relay agents must join the appropriate multicast groups on relevant interfaces.

Notes

- Link-local multicast traffic (ff02::1:2) is never forwarded beyond the local link.
- Site-local multicast (ff05::1:3) requires the relay agent to have an address with sufficient scope to reach servers within the site.
- Multicast support is mandatory for correct DHCPv6 operation.

=== Port numbers ===
Clients listen for DHCP messages on UDP port 546. Servers and relay agents listen for DHCP messages on UDP port 547.

=== Identifiers ===
==== DHCP unique identifier ====
The DHCP unique identifier (DUID) is used by a client to get an IP address from a DHCPv6 server. It has a 2-byte DUID type field, and a variable-length identifier field up to 128 bytes. Its actual length depends on its type. The server compares the DUID with its database and delivers configuration data (address, lease times, DNS servers, etc.) to the client.

Four DUID types are identified:

Type	Name	Description
1	DUID-LLT	link-layer address plus time
2	DUID-EN	Vendor-assigned identifier based on Enterprise Number
3	DUID-LL	link-layer address
4	DUID-UUID	Universally Unique Identifier (UUID)

==== RFC 6939: Client Link-Layer Address Option ====
Due to the fact that it is difficult to manage multiple identifiers in a dual-stack environment, and the fact that DUIDs are simply not optimal for some situations, RFC 6939 was released, giving a way to identify a host based on its MAC address. It defines a way for a DHCPv6 relay to pass that information to a DHCPv6 server.

=== Example ===
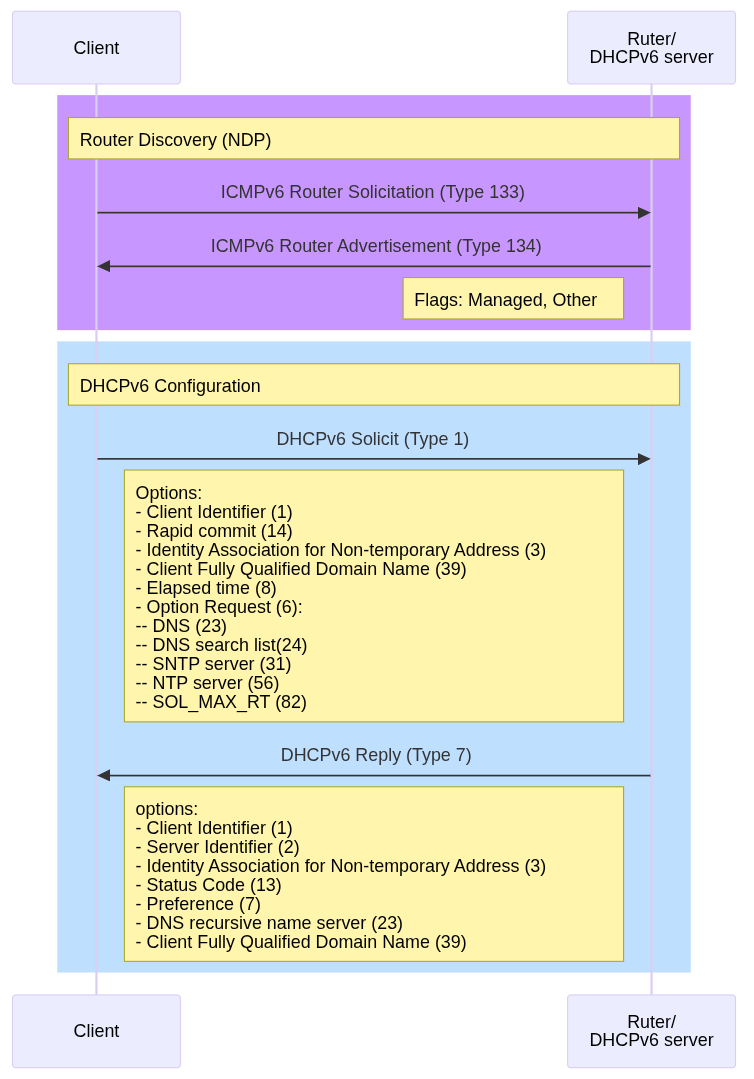
DHCPv6 Example sequence Diagram, with Router Discovery (NDP)

In this example, without rapid-commit present, the server's link-local address is fe80::0011:22ff:fe33:5566 and the client's link-local address is fe80::aabb:ccff:fedd:eeff.

- Client sends a solicit from [fe80::aabb:ccff:fedd:eeff]:546 to multicast address [ff02::1:2]:547.
- Server replies with an advertise from [fe80::0011:22ff:fe33:5566]:547 to [fe80::aabb:ccff:fedd:eeff]:546.
- Client replies with a request from [fe80::aabb:ccff:fedd:eeff]:546 to [ff02::1:2]:547.
- Server finishes with a reply from [fe80::0011:22ff:fe33:5566]:547 to [fe80::aabb:ccff:fedd:eeff]:546.

== Client/Server Message Formats ==
DHCP messages utilize a fixed-format header followed by a variable-format options area.

=== Message Structure Overview ===
All values in the message header and options are encoded in network byte order.

Client/Server Message Format
Offset	Octet	0								1								2								3							
Octet	Bit	0	1	2	3	4	5	6	7	8	9	10	11	12	13	14	15	16	17	18	19	20	21	22	23	24	25	26	27	28	29	30	31
0	0	msg-type								transaction-id																							
4	32	Options; code, length and data. (variable number and length)																															
8	64	Options; code, length and data. (variable number and length)																															
⋮	⋮	Options; code, length and data. (variable number and length)																															

msg-type: 8 bits
Identifies the DHCP message type
transaction-id: 24 bits
Value to synchronize server responses to client messages. Random number generated by client.
Options: Variable bits
Options have up to three fields: Option-code (2 octet), Option-Length (2 octet), Option-Data (variable). Depending on Option-code value, the next two fields may be set. Option-Length indicates the total length of the option, and Option-Data contains data associated with the option, if applicable.

==== Message Types ====
This table lists the DHCPv6 message types.

DHCPv6 Message Types
Code	Name	Description	RFC
1	SOLICIT	Client initiates to locate available servers.	RFC 8415
2	ADVERTISE	Server indicates availability in response to Solicit.	RFC 8415
3	REQUEST	Client requests parameters/addresses from a specific server.	RFC 8415
4	CONFIRM	Client verifies if assigned addresses remain valid for the link.	RFC 8415
5	RENEW	Client requests lease extension from the original server.	RFC 8415
6	REBIND	Client requests lease extension from any available server after a RENEW fails.	RFC 8415
7	REPLY	Server provides leases, parameters, or acknowledgments in response to client messages.	RFC 8415
8	RELEASE	Client notifies the issuing server that it is relinquishing one or more leases.	RFC 8415
9	DECLINE	Client notifies server that assigned addresses are already in use on the link.	RFC 8415
10	RECONFIGURE	Server prompts client to initiate a transaction to receive updated parameters.	RFC 8415
11	INFORMATION-REQUEST	Client requests configuration parameters without lease assignments.	RFC 8415
12	RELAY-FORW	Relay agent forwards a message to a server. The original message is encapsulated within an option.	RFC 8415
13	RELAY-REPL	Server sends a response to a relay agent. The response for the client is encapsulated within an option for the relay to extract.	RFC 8415
14	LEASEQUERY	A requestor queries a server to retrieve information regarding a client's lease state. The query scope is defined by the OPTION_LQ_QUERY.	RFC 5007
15	LEASEQUERY-REPLY	The server responds to a LEASEQUERY with the requested client lease data or status.	RFC 5007
16	LEASEQUERY-DONE	Signals the termination of a leasequery response stream.	RFC 5460
17	LEASEQUERY-DATA	Transmits data for a single client's leases or Prefix Delegation (PD) bindings.	RFC 5460
18	RECONFIGURE-REQUEST		RFC 6977
19	RECONFIGURE-REPLY		RFC 6977
20	DHCPV4-QUERY	Client sends this to a DHCP 4o6 server. It contains the DHCPv4 message within a 'DHCPv4 Message' option.	RFC 7341
21	DHCPV4-RESPONSE	Server responds to the client. It carries the resulting DHCPv4 message inside a 'DHCPv4 Message' option.	RFC 7341
22	ACTIVELEASEQUERY	Provide real-time (or near real-time) updates on DHCPv6 binding activity. Unlike a standard query, it instructs the server to transmit updates as they occur after the request is received.	RFC 7653
23	STARTTLS	Initiates the establishment of a Transport Layer Security (TLS) connection between a requestor and a DHCPv6 server.	RFC 7653

==== Option Codes ====
This table lists some of DHCPv6 Option codes. Full list can be for her IANA DHCPv6 Option Codes

DHCPv6 Option Codes
Option-Code	Name	Description	RFC
1	OPTION_CLIENTID	Carries a DUID to uniquely identify the client.	RFC 8415
2	OPTION_SERVERID	Carries a DUID to uniquely identify the server.	RFC 8415
3	OPTION_IA_NA	Container for non-temporary address assignments and associated parameters.	RFC 8415
4	OPTION_IA_TA	Container for temporary address assignments.	RFC 8415
5	OPTION_IAADDR	Specifies an IPv6 address associated with an IA_NA or IA_TA.	RFC 8415
6	OPTION_ORO	Identifies a list of requested options by their option codes.	RFC 8415
7	OPTION_PREFERENCE	Provides a preference value to influence the client's server selection.	RFC 8415
8	OPTION_ELAPSED_TIME	Reports the duration of the current DHCP transaction in hundredths of a second.	RFC 8415
9	OPTION_RELAY_MSG	Encapsulates a DHCPv6 message for transmission between relay agents and servers.	RFC 8415
11	OPTION_AUTH	Carries authentication information to verify the identity of the sender.	RFC 8415
12	OPTION_UNICAST	Indicates a server unicast address the client may use for direct contact.	RFC 8415
13	OPTION_STATUS_CODE	Communicates success or failure status and associated error messages.	RFC 8415
14	OPTION_RAPID_COMMIT	Signals the use of a two-message exchange for address assignment.	RFC 8415
15	OPTION_USER_CLASS	Identifies the type or category of user or application on the client.	RFC 8415
16	OPTION_VENDOR_CLASS	Identifies the vendor and hardware/software configuration of the client.	RFC 8415
17	OPTION_VENDOR_OPTS	Carries vendor-specific information and parameters.	RFC 8415
18	OPTION_INTERFACE_ID	Identifies the specific interface on which a relay agent received a message.	RFC 8415
19	OPTION_RECONF_MSG	Specifies the message type a client must use when responding to reconfiguration.	RFC 8415
20	OPTION_RECONF_ACCEPT	Signals that the client supports and will accept Reconfigure messages.	RFC 8415
25	OPTION_IA_PD	Container for prefix delegation identity associations and parameters.	RFC 8415
26	OPTION_IAPREFIX	Specifies an IPv6 prefix associated with an IA_PD.	RFC 8415
32	OPTION_INFORMATION_REFRESH_TIME	Defines the interval at which a client should refresh its configuration information.	RFC 8415
82	OPTION_SOL_MAX_RT	Defines the maximum retransmission timeout for Solicit messages.	RFC 8415
83	OPTION_INF_MAX_RT	Defines the maximum retransmission timeout for Information-request messages.	RFC 8415

=== DHCP Unique Identifier (DUID) option ===
All devices participating in a DHCPv6 exchange, whether acting as a client or a server, must possess a single DHCP Unique Identifier (DUID) to establish a persistent identity within the network. This identifier is carried in the OPTION_CLIENTID (1) and OPTION_SERVERID (2) fields to ensure that transactions remain consistent even if hardware interfaces are swapped or addresses are reassigned. The DUID is designed to be permanent across reboots and reconfigurations, acting as the definitive anchor for the server’s binding database and the client’s server-selection logic.

==== DUID-LLT (Link-Layer Address Plus Time) ====
DUID-LLT (Type 1) consists of:

- DUID type (1)
- Hardware type (IANA-assigned)
- Time value (seconds since 00:00 UTC, 1 January 2000, modulo 2³²)
- link-layer address

The time component reduces the likelihood of collisions if the same link-layer address is reused on another device. Devices using DUID-LLT must store the generated identifier in stable, non-volatile storage and continue using it even if the original network interface is removed.

This type is recommended for general-purpose computing devices such as desktops, laptops, and printers, that provide writable persistent storage.

DUID-LLT Format
Offset	Octet	0								1								2								3							
Octet	Bit	0	1	2	3	4	5	6	7	8	9	10	11	12	13	14	15	16	17	18	19	20	21	22	23	24	25	26	27	28	29	30	31
0	0	DUID-Type (1)																hardware type															
4	32	time																															
8	64	link-layer address (variable length)																															
12	96	link-layer address (variable length)																															
16	128	link-layer address (variable length)																															
20	160	link-layer address (variable length)																															

==== DUID-EN (Enterprise Number) ====
DUID-EN (Type 2) is assigned by the device vendor and consists of:

- DUID type (2)
- Vendor’s IANA-assigned Private Enterprise Number
- Vendor-defined unique identifier

The identifier must be unique per device and stored in non-volatile storage. This type is commonly assigned during manufacturing or at first boot in virtualized environments.

DUID-EN Format
Offset	Octet	0								1								2								3							
Octet	Bit	0	1	2	3	4	5	6	7	8	9	10	11	12	13	14	15	16	17	18	19	20	21	22	23	24	25	26	27	28	29	30	31
0	0	DUID-Type (2)																enterprise-number															
4	32	enterprise-number (cont.)																															
8	64	identifier (variable length)																															
⋮	⋮	identifier (variable length)																															
34	272	identifier (variable length)																															

==== DUID-LL (Link-Layer Address) ====
DUID-LL (Type 3) consists of:

- DUID type (3)
- Hardware type
- link-layer address

Unlike DUID-LLT, no time value is included. This type is intended for devices with a permanently attached network interface and no writable persistent storage. It should not be used if the permanence of the interface cannot be guaranteed.

DUID-LL Format
Offset	Octet	0								1								2								3							
Octet	Bit	0	1	2	3	4	5	6	7	8	9	10	11	12	13	14	15	16	17	18	19	20	21	22	23	24	25	26	27	28	29	30	31
0	0	DUID-Type (3)																hardware type															
4	32	link-layer address (variable length)																															
8	64	link-layer address (variable length)																															
12	96	link-layer address (variable length)																															
16	128	link-layer address (variable length)																															

==== DUID-UUID (Universally Unique Identifier) ====
DUID-UUID (Type 4) uses a 128-bit UUID as its identifier.

DUID-UUID consists of:

- DUID type (4)
- Universally Unique Identifier

Its usage and UUID selection rules are defined in RFC 6355. This type is suitable for devices that already store a UUID in firmware or platform configuration.

DUID-UUID Format
Offset	Octet	0								1								2								3							
Octet	Bit	0	1	2	3	4	5	6	7	8	9	10	11	12	13	14	15	16	17	18	19	20	21	22	23	24	25	26	27	28	29	30	31
0	0	DUID-Type (4)																															
4	32	Universally Unique Identifier																															
8	64	Universally Unique Identifier																															
12	96	Universally Unique Identifier																															
16	128	Universally Unique Identifier																															

=== Option Request Option (ORO) ===
The Option Request Option (ORO), identified by OPTION_ORO (6), is the mechanism used by a DHCPv6 client to inform the server which configuration parameters it is interested in receiving. Rather than the server blindly pushing all available data, the client provides a list of option codes within the ORO to tailor the response to its specific needs.

The Option Request Option is defined by IANA DHCPv6 Option Codes

Client Responsibility: The client MUST include an ORO in messages like Solicit, Request, Renew, and Rebind if it requires specific information (such as DNS recursive name servers or domain search lists).

Server Responsibility: The server uses the ORO as a guide. It should include the requested options in its response, provided those options are configured and appropriate for the client's link.

Option Request Option Format
Offset	Octet	0								1								2								3							
Octet	Bit	0	1	2	3	4	5	6	7	8	9	10	11	12	13	14	15	16	17	18	19	20	21	22	23	24	25	26	27	28	29	30	31
0	0	OPTION_ORO (6)																option-len (2 * number of requested options)															
4	32	requested-option-code-1																requested-option-code-2															
8	64	...																															
12	96	...																															
⋮	⋮	...																															

Common DHCPv6 Option Request Codes

In a standard network deployment, a client typically includes the following option codes in its OPTION_ORO (6) to ensure a functional IPv6 environment:

Code	Name	Function
23	DNS_SERVERS	Requests a list of IPv6 addresses for recursive DNS servers.
24	DOMAIN_LIST	Requests the domain search list for suffix completion.
31	SNTP_SERVERS	Requests a list of Simple Network Time Protocol (SNTP) servers.
32	INF_REFRESH_TIME	Requests the interval for when to refresh stateless information.
56	NTP_SERVER	Requests Network Time Protocol (NTP) server information (RFC 5908).
59	BOOTFILE_URL	Used in PXE booting to request the location of a boot image.

== IETF standards ==
- RFC 8415, "Dynamic Host Configuration Protocol for IPv6 (DHCPv6)" - Obsoletes RFC 3315, RFC 3633, RFC 3736, RFC 4242, RFC 7083, RFC 7283, RFC 7550.
- RFC 3319, "Dynamic Host Configuration Protocol (DHCPv6) Options for Session Initiation Protocol (SIP) Servers"
- RFC 3646, "DNS Configuration options for Dynamic Host Configuration Protocol for IPv6 (DHCPv6)"
- RFC 4704, "The Dynamic Host Configuration Protocol for IPv6 (DHCPv6) Client Fully Qualified Domain Name (FQDN) Option"
- RFC 5007, "DHCPv6 Leasequery" support
- RFC 6221, "Lightweight DHCPv6 Relay Agent" (LDRA) - Updates RFC 3315, Errata
- RFC 6355, "Definition of the UUID-Based DHCPv6 Unique Identifier (DUID-UUID)"
- RFC 6939, "Client Link-Layer Address Option in DHCPv6"
- RFC 7653, "DHCPv6 Active Leasequery"

== See also ==
- Comparison of DHCP server software
- Dynamic Host Configuration Protocol (DHCP)
- Neighbor Discovery Protocol, which also supports DNS Configuration
- Prefix delegation, which allows a DHCPv6 client to obtain a whole prefix.
