= Internet Systems Consortium =

American non-profit corporation

- Formation: 1994; 32 years ago
- Founder: Paul Vixie; Carl Malamud; Rick Adams
- Type: Network Engineering
- Legal status: 501(c)(3) organization
- Purpose: DNS, Internet
- Location: Newmarket, New Hampshire, U.S.
- Region served: Worldwide
- Products: BIND, DHCPD, Kea
- Key people: Jeff Osborn (President)
- Employees: 35
- Website: www.isc.org
- Formerly called: Internet Software Consortium
- ASN: 3557

Internet Systems Consortium, Inc., also known as ISC, is an American non-profit corporation that supports the infrastructure of the universal, self-organizing Internet by developing and maintaining core production-quality software, protocols, and operations. ISC has developed several key Internet technologies that enable the global Internet, including: BIND, ISC DHCP and Kea. Other software projects no longer in active development include OpenReg and ISC AFTR (an implementation of an IPv4/IPv6 transition protocol based on Dual-Stack Lite).

ISC operates one of the 13 global authoritative DNS root servers, F-Root.

Over the years a number of additional software systems were operated under ISC (for example: INN and Lynx) to better support the Internet's infrastructure. ISC also expanded their operational activities to include Internet hosting facilities for other open-source projects such as NetBSD, XFree86, kernel.org, secondary name-service (SNS) for more than 50 top-level domains, and a DNS OARC (Operations, Analysis and Research Center) for monitoring and reporting of the Internet's DNS.

ISC is actively involved in the community design process; it authors and participates in the development of the IETF standards, including the production of managed open-source software used as a reference implementation of the DNS.

ISC is primarily funded by the sale of technical support contracts for its open source software.

== History ==
Originally the company was founded as the Internet Software Consortium, Inc. The founders included Paul Vixie, Rick Adams and Carl Malamud. The corporation was intended to continue the development of BIND software. The founders believed that it was necessary that BIND's maintenance and development be managed and funded by an independent organization. ISC was designated as a root name server operator by IANA, originally as NS.ISC.ORG and later as F.ROOT-SERVERS.NET.

In January 2004, ISC reorganized under the new name Internet Systems Consortium, Inc.

In July 2013, ISC spun off the Security Business Unit to Farsight Security, Inc. a new company started by ISC founder Paul Vixie.

In early 2020, ISC closed its headquarters in Redwood City, California and moved its operations to Newmarket, New Hampshire.

== Open Source ==
ISC develops and maintains open source networking software, including BIND and two DHCP implementations: ISC DHCP and Kea DHCP. ISC also distributes INN and several older, unmaintained projects. Some early aspects of its software were developed by developers that were commercially employed by Nominum, amongst others.

== ISC license ==
ISC developed and used the ISC license, which is functionally similar to the simplified BSD and MIT licenses. The ISC license is OpenBSD's preferred license for new code.

All current versions of ISC-hosted software are available under the Mozilla Public License 2.0.

== DNS root server ==
ISC operates the DNS "F" root server, the first such server to be distributed using anycast. In 2007 it was announced that ISC and ICANN would sign an agreement regarding the operation of F, the first such agreement made between ICANN and a root-server operator.

== Usenet moderators list ==
ISC maintains and publishes (on ftp.isc.org) the central Usenet moderators list and relays for moderated groups, so individual server operators don't have to track moderator changes.

== Internet Domain Survey ==
Number of Internet hosts worldwide in 1970–2015

The Internet Domain Survey searched the Domain Name System (DNS) to discover every Internet host. The survey began when only a few hundred hosts were Internet-linked. The earliest published reports, dated 1993, were performed by Network Wizards owner Mark K. Lottor. The Internet host count was 1313000 in January 1993 and 1062660523 in the January 2017 survey.

ISC ended its sponsorship and publication of the Internet Domain Survey in 2019.

== See also ==
- Open Source Applications Foundation (OSAF)
