= Dynamic Host Configuration Protocol =

Principal protocol used to assign IPv4 addresses on an IPv4 network

- Dynamic Host Configuration Protocol
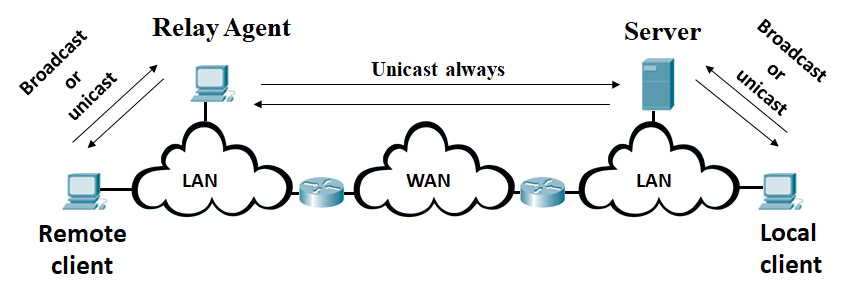
- The dynamic host configuration protocol (DHCP) according to client/server model, as well as the traffic routing types between the components of the protocol topology.
- Abbreviation: DHCP
- Status: Active
- Year started: October 1993; 33 years ago
- First published: October 1993
- Latest version: IPv4: RFC 2131; IPv6: RFC 9915; IPv4: March 1997; IPv6: November 2018
- Organization: Internet Engineering Task Force (IETF)
- Committee: Dynamic Host Configuration (dhc) Working Group
- Series: Standards Track
- Editors: Ralph Droms
- Authors: Ralph Droms
- Base standards: Bootstrap Protocol (BOOTP)
- Related standards: RFC 2131, RFC 2132, RFC 3315, RFC 8415
- Predecessor: Bootstrap Protocol (BOOTP)
- Domain: Computer networking
- License: Public domain (IETF RFC)
- Copyright: Internet Society
- Website: ietf.org

The Dynamic Host Configuration Protocol (DHCP) is a network management protocol used on Internet Protocol (IP) networks for automatically assigning IP addresses and other communication parameters to devices connected to the network using a client–server architecture.

The technology eliminates the need for individually configuring network devices manually, and consists of two network components, a centrally installed network DHCP server and client instances of the protocol stack on each computer or device. When connected to the network, and periodically thereafter, a client requests a set of parameters from the server using DHCP.

DHCP can be implemented on networks ranging in size from residential networks to large campus networks and regional ISP networks. Many routers and residential gateways have DHCP server capability. Most residential network routers receive a unique IP address within the ISP network. Within a local network, a DHCP server assigns a local IP address to each device.

DHCP services exist for networks running Internet Protocol version 4 (IPv4), as well as version 6 (IPv6). The IPv6 version of the DHCP protocol is commonly called DHCPv6.

== History ==
The Reverse Address Resolution Protocol (RARP) was defined in 1984 for the configuration of simple devices, such as diskless workstations, with a suitable IP address. Acting in the data link layer, it made implementation difficult on many server platforms. It required that a server be present on each individual network link. RARP was superseded by the Bootstrap Protocol (BOOTP) defined in September 1985. This introduced the concept of a relay agent, which allowed the forwarding of BOOTP packets across networks, allowing one central BOOTP server to serve hosts on many IP subnets.

DHCP was first defined in October 1993. It is based on BOOTP, but can dynamically allocate IP addresses from a pool and reclaim them when they are no longer in use. It can also be used to deliver a wide range of extra configuration parameters to IP clients, including platform-specific parameters.

Four years later, the DHCPINFORM message type (used for WPAD) and other small changes were added. This definition, from 1997, remains the core of the standard for IPv4 networks.

DHCPv6 was initially defined in 2003. After updates by many subsequent RFCs, its definition was replaced in 2018, where prefix delegation and stateless address autoconfiguration were now merged.

== Overview ==
Internet Protocol (IP) defines how devices communicate within and across local networks on the Internet. A DHCP server can manage IP settings for devices on its local network, e.g., by assigning IP addresses to those devices automatically and dynamically.

DHCP operates based on the client–server model. When a computer or other device connects to a network, the DHCP client software sends a DHCP broadcast query requesting the necessary information. Any DHCP server on the network may service the request. The DHCP server manages a pool of IP addresses and information about client configuration parameters such as default gateway, domain name, the name servers, and time servers. On receiving a DHCP request, the DHCP server may respond with specific information for each client, as previously configured by an administrator, or with a specific address and any other information valid for the entire network and for the time period for which the allocation (lease) is valid. A DHCP client typically queries this information immediately after booting, and periodically thereafter before the expiration of the information. When a DHCP client refreshes an assignment, it initially requests the same parameter values, but the DHCP server may assign a new address based on the assignment policies set by administrators.

On large networks that consist of multiple links, a single DHCP server may service the entire network when aided by DHCP relay agents located on the interconnecting routers. Such agents relay messages between DHCP clients and DHCP servers located on different subnets.

Depending on implementation, the DHCP server may have three methods of allocating IP addresses:

Dynamic allocation
A network administrator reserves a range of IP addresses for DHCP, and each DHCP client on the LAN is configured to request an IP address from the DHCP server during network initialization. The request-and-grant process uses a lease concept with a controllable time period, allowing the DHCP server to reclaim and then reallocate IP addresses that are not renewed.
Automatic allocation
The DHCP server permanently assigns an IP address to a requesting client from a range defined by an administrator. This is like dynamic allocation, but the DHCP server keeps a table of past IP address assignments, so that it can preferentially assign to a client the same IP address that the client previously had.
Manual allocation
This method is also variously called static DHCP allocation, fixed address allocation, reservation, and MAC/IP address binding. An administrator maps a unique identifier (a client id or MAC address) for each client to an IP address, which is offered to the requesting client. DHCP servers may be configured to fall back to other methods if this fails.

DHCP services are used for Internet Protocol version 4 (IPv4) and IPv6. The details of the protocol for IPv4 and IPv6 differ sufficiently that they may be considered separate protocols. For the IPv6 operation, devices may alternatively use stateless address autoconfiguration. IPv6 hosts may also use link-local addressing to achieve operations restricted to the local network link.

== Operation ==
An illustration of a typical non-renewing DHCP session; each message may be either a broadcast or a unicast, depending on the DHCP client capabilities.

The DHCP employs a connectionless service model, using the User Datagram Protocol (UDP). It is implemented with two UDP port numbers for its operations which are the same as for the bootstrap protocol (BOOTP). The server listens on UDP port number 67, and the client listens on UDP port number 68.

DHCP operations fall into four phases: server discovery, IP lease offer, IP lease request, and IP lease acknowledgement. These stages are often abbreviated as DORA for discovery, offer, request, and acknowledgement.

The DHCP operation begins with clients broadcasting a request. If the client and server are in different broadcast domains, a DHCP Helper or DHCP Relay Agent may be used. Clients requesting renewal of an existing lease may communicate directly via UDP unicast, since the client already has an established IP address at that point. Additionally, there is a BROADCAST flag (1 bit in 2 byte flags field, where all other bits are reserved and so are set to 0) the client can use to indicate in which way (broadcast or unicast) it can receive the DHCPOFFER: 0x8000 for broadcast, 0x0000 for unicast. Usually, the DHCPOFFER is sent through unicast. For those hosts which cannot accept unicast packets before IP addresses are configured, this flag can be used to work around this issue.

=== Discovery ===
The DHCP client broadcasts a DHCPDISCOVER message on the network subnet using the destination address 255.255.255.255 (limited broadcast) or the specific subnet broadcast address (directed broadcast). A DHCP client may also request an IP address in the DHCPDISCOVER, which the server may take into account when selecting an address to offer.

For example, if HTYPE is set to 1, to specify that the medium used is Ethernet, HLEN is set to 6 because an Ethernet address (MAC address) is 6 octets long. The CHADDR is set to the MAC address used by the client. Some options are set as well.

Example Ethernet frame with a DHCPDISCOVER message
Offset	Octet	0								1								2								3							
Octet	Bit	0	1	2	3	4	5	6	7	8	9	10	11	12	13	14	15	16	17	18	19	20	21	22	23	24	25	26	27	28	29	30	31
0	0	Destination MAC (FF:FF:FF:FF:FF:FF)																															
4	32																																
8	64	Source MAC (00:05:3C:04:8D:59)																															
12	96	EtherType (0x0800)																															
16	128	IPv4 packet, containing a UDP PDU with DHCP payload...																															
20	160	IPv4 packet, containing a UDP PDU with DHCP payload...																															
⋮	⋮	IPv4 packet, containing a UDP PDU with DHCP payload...																															
⋮	⋮	Frame Check Sequence																															

IPv4 Header
Offset	Octet	0								1								2								3							
Octet	Bit	0	1	2	3	4	5	6	7	8	9	10	11	12	13	14	15	16	17	18	19	20	21	22	23	24	25	26	27	28	29	30	31
0	0	IPv4 header start																															
4	32	IPv4 header start																															
8	64	TTL								Protocol (17 UDP)								Header Checksum															
12	96	Source Address (0.0.0.0)																															
16	128	Destination Address																															

UDP Header
Offset	Octet	0								1								2								3							
Octet	Bit	0	1	2	3	4	5	6	7	8	9	10	11	12	13	14	15	16	17	18	19	20	21	22	23	24	25	26	27	28	29	30	31
20	160	Source Port (68)																Destination Port (67)															
24	192	Length																Checksum															

DHCP Payload: DHCPDISCOVER
Offset	Octet	0								1								2								3							
Octet	Bit	0	1	2	3	4	5	6	7	8	9	10	11	12	13	14	15	16	17	18	19	20	21	22	23	24	25	26	27	28	29	30	31
28	224	OP (0x01)								HTYPE (0x01)								HLEN (0x06)								HOPS (0x00)							
32	256	XID (0x3903F326)																															
36	288	SECS (0x0000)																FLAGS (0x0000)															
40	320	CIADDR (Client IP address: 0x00000000)																															
44	352	YIADDR (Your IP address: 0x00000000)																															
48	384	SIADDR (Server IP address: 0x00000000)																															
52	416	GIADDR (Gateway IP address: 0x00000000)																															
56	448	CHADDR (Client Hardware address: 0x00053C04; 0x8D590000; 0x00000000 0x00000000)																															
60	480	CHADDR (Client Hardware address: 0x00053C04; 0x8D590000; 0x00000000 0x00000000)																															
64	512	CHADDR (Client Hardware address: 0x00053C04; 0x8D590000; 0x00000000 0x00000000)																															
68	544	CHADDR (Client Hardware address: 0x00053C04; 0x8D590000; 0x00000000 0x00000000)																															
72	576	192 octets of 0s, or overflow space for additional options; BOOTP legacy.																															
⋮	⋮	192 octets of 0s, or overflow space for additional options; BOOTP legacy.																															
260	2080	192 octets of 0s, or overflow space for additional options; BOOTP legacy.																															
264	2112	Magic Cookie (0x63825363)																															

DHCP Options (in TLV format)
Offset	Octet	0								1								2								3							
Octet	Bit	0	1	2	3	4	5	6	7	8	9	10	11	12	13	14	15	16	17	18	19	20	21	22	23	24	25	26	27	28	29	30	31
268	2144	First option: 0x350101: Option 53 (DHCP Message Type) 1 octet (containing DHCPDISCOVER)																								Second option:↴							
272	2176	↪0x3204c0a80164: Option 50 (Request IP address) 4 octets (containing 192.168.1.100)																															
276	2208	Third option: 0x370401030f06: Option: 55 (Parameter Request List) 4 octets↴																															
280	2240	↪PRL cont...								ff																							

=== Offer ===
When a DHCP server receives a DHCPDISCOVER message from a client, which is an IP address lease request, the DHCP server reserves an IP address for the client and makes a lease offer by sending a DHCPOFFER message to the client. This message may contain the client's Client ID (Option 61, containing a unique value, traditionally a MAC address), the IP address that the server is offering, the subnet mask, the lease duration, and the IP address of the DHCP server making the offer. The DHCP server may also take notice of the hardware-level MAC address (as specified in the CHADDR field). This field must be used to identify the client, if no Client ID is provided in the DHCP packet.

The DHCP server determines the configuration based on the client's hardware address as specified in the CHADDR (client hardware address) field. In the following example the server (192.168.1.1) specifies the client's IP address in the YIADDR (your IP address) field.

Example Ethernet frame with a DHCPOFFER message
Offset	Octet	0								1								2								3							
Octet	Bit	0	1	2	3	4	5	6	7	8	9	10	11	12	13	14	15	16	17	18	19	20	21	22	23	24	25	26	27	28	29	30	31
0	0	Destination MAC (00:05:3C:04:8D:59)																															
4	32																																
8	64	Source MAC (B4:0C:25:E3:7D:62)																															
12	96	EtherType (0x0800)																															
16	128	IPv4 packet, containing a UDP PDU with DHCP payload...																															
20	160	IPv4 packet, containing a UDP PDU with DHCP payload...																															
⋮	⋮	IPv4 packet, containing a UDP PDU with DHCP payload...																															
⋮	⋮	Frame Check Sequence																															

IPv4 Header
Offset	Octet	0								1								2								3							
Octet	Bit	0	1	2	3	4	5	6	7	8	9	10	11	12	13	14	15	16	17	18	19	20	21	22	23	24	25	26	27	28	29	30	31
0	0	IPv4 header start																															
4	32	IPv4 header start																															
8	64	TTL								Protocol (17 UDP)								Header Checksum															
12	96	Source Address (192.168.1.1)																															
16	128	Destination Address (192.168.1.100)																															

UDP Header
Offset	Octet	0								1								2								3							
Octet	Bit	0	1	2	3	4	5	6	7	8	9	10	11	12	13	14	15	16	17	18	19	20	21	22	23	24	25	26	27	28	29	30	31
20	160	Source Port (67)																Destination Port (68)															
24	192	Length																Checksum															

DHCP Payload: DHCPOFFER
Offset	Octet	0								1								2								3							
Octet	Bit	0	1	2	3	4	5	6	7	8	9	10	11	12	13	14	15	16	17	18	19	20	21	22	23	24	25	26	27	28	29	30	31
28	224	OP (0x02)								HTYPE (0x01)								HLEN (0x06)								HOPS (0x00)							
32	256	XID (0x3903F326)																															
36	288	SECS (0x0000)																FLAGS (0x0000)															
40	320	CIADDR (Client IP address: 0x00000000)																															
44	352	YIADDR (Your IP address: 0xC0A80164 or 192.168.1.100)																															
48	384	SIADDR (Server IP address: 0xC0A80101 or 192.168.1.1)																															
52	416	GIADDR (Gateway IP address: 0x00000000)																															
56	448	CHADDR (Client Hardware address: 0x00053C04; 0x8D590000; 0x00000000 0x00000000)																															
60	480	CHADDR (Client Hardware address: 0x00053C04; 0x8D590000; 0x00000000 0x00000000)																															
64	512	CHADDR (Client Hardware address: 0x00053C04; 0x8D590000; 0x00000000 0x00000000)																															
68	544	CHADDR (Client Hardware address: 0x00053C04; 0x8D590000; 0x00000000 0x00000000)																															
72	576	192 octets of 0s, or overflow space for additional options; BOOTP legacy.																															
⋮	⋮	192 octets of 0s, or overflow space for additional options; BOOTP legacy.																															
260	2080	192 octets of 0s, or overflow space for additional options; BOOTP legacy.																															
264	2112	Magic Cookie (0x63825363)																															

DHCP Options (in TLV format)
Offset	Octet	0								1								2								3							
Octet	Bit	0	1	2	3	4	5	6	7	8	9	10	11	12	13	14	15	16	17	18	19	20	21	22	23	24	25	26	27	28	29	30	31
268	2144	First option: 0x350102: Option 53 (DHCP Message Type) 1 octet (containing DHCPOFFER)																								Second option:↴							
272	2176	↪0x0104ffffff00: Option 1 (Subnet mask) 4 octets (containing 255.255.255.0)																															
276	2208	Third option: 0x0304c0A80101: Option: 3 (Router) 4 octets (containing 192.168.1.1)↴																															
280	2240	↪Router cont...								Fourth option: 0x330400015080: Option 51 (Address time) 4 octets (a 86400 second lease time)↴																							
284	2272	↪Address time cont...																Fifth option:															
288	2304	0x060c09070a0f09070a1009070a13: Option 6 (Domain Server) 14 octets (containing 9.7.10.15,9.7.10.16,9.7.10.18)																															
292	2336	0x060c09070a0f09070a1009070a13: Option 6 (Domain Server) 14 octets (containing 9.7.10.15,9.7.10.16,9.7.10.18)																															
296	2368	0x060c09070a0f09070a1009070a13: Option 6 (Domain Server) 14 octets (containing 9.7.10.15,9.7.10.16,9.7.10.18)																															
300	2400													ff																			

=== Request ===
In response to the DHCP offer, the client replies with a DHCPREQUEST message, broadcast to the server, (Note: As an optional client behavior, some broadcasts, such as those carrying DHCP discovery and request messages, may be replaced with unicasts in case the DHCP client already knows the DHCP server's IP address.) requesting the offered address. A client can receive DHCP offers from multiple servers, but it will accept only one DHCP offer.

The client must send the server identification option in the DHCPREQUEST message, indicating the server whose offer the client has selected. When other DHCP servers receive this message, they withdraw any offers that they have made to the client and return their offered IP address to the pool of available addresses.

Example Ethernet frame with a DHCPREQUEST message
Offset	Octet	0								1								2								3							
Octet	Bit	0	1	2	3	4	5	6	7	8	9	10	11	12	13	14	15	16	17	18	19	20	21	22	23	24	25	26	27	28	29	30	31
0	0	Destination MAC (FF:FF:FF:FF:FF:FF)																															
4	32																																
8	64	Source MAC (00:05:3C:04:8D:59)																															
12	96	EtherType (0x0800)																															
16	128	IPv4 packet, containing a UDP PDU with DHCP payload...																															
20	160	IPv4 packet, containing a UDP PDU with DHCP payload...																															
⋮	⋮	IPv4 packet, containing a UDP PDU with DHCP payload...																															
⋮	⋮	Frame Check Sequence																															

IPv4 Header
Offset	Octet	0								1								2								3							
Octet	Bit	0	1	2	3	4	5	6	7	8	9	10	11	12	13	14	15	16	17	18	19	20	21	22	23	24	25	26	27	28	29	30	31
0	0	IPv4 header start																															
4	32	IPv4 header start																															
8	64	TTL								Protocol (17 UDP)								Header Checksum															
12	96	Source Address (0.0.0.0)																															
16	128	Destination Address (255.255.255.255)																															

UDP Header
Offset	Octet	0								1								2								3							
Octet	Bit	0	1	2	3	4	5	6	7	8	9	10	11	12	13	14	15	16	17	18	19	20	21	22	23	24	25	26	27	28	29	30	31
20	160	Source Port (68)																Destination Port (67)															
24	192	Length																Checksum															

DHCP Payload: DHCPREQUEST
Offset	Octet	0								1								2								3							
Octet	Bit	0	1	2	3	4	5	6	7	8	9	10	11	12	13	14	15	16	17	18	19	20	21	22	23	24	25	26	27	28	29	30	31
28	224	OP (0x01)								HTYPE (0x01)								HLEN (0x06)								HOPS (0x00)							
32	256	XID (0x3903F326)																															
36	288	SECS (0x0000)																FLAGS (0x0000)															
40	320	CIADDR (Client IP address: 0x00000000)																															
44	352	YIADDR (Your IP address: 0x00000000)																															
48	384	SIADDR (Server IP address: 0xc0a80101 or 192.168.1.1)																															
52	416	GIADDR (Gateway IP address: 0x00000000)																															
56	448	CHADDR (Client Hardware address: 0x00053C04; 0x8D590000; 0x00000000 0x00000000)																															
60	480	CHADDR (Client Hardware address: 0x00053C04; 0x8D590000; 0x00000000 0x00000000)																															
64	512	CHADDR (Client Hardware address: 0x00053C04; 0x8D590000; 0x00000000 0x00000000)																															
68	544	CHADDR (Client Hardware address: 0x00053C04; 0x8D590000; 0x00000000 0x00000000)																															
72	576	192 octets of 0s, or overflow space for additional options; BOOTP legacy.																															
⋮	⋮	192 octets of 0s, or overflow space for additional options; BOOTP legacy.																															
260	2080	192 octets of 0s, or overflow space for additional options; BOOTP legacy.																															
264	2112	Magic Cookie (0x63825363)																															

DHCP Options (in TLV format)
Offset	Octet	0								1								2								3							
Octet	Bit	0	1	2	3	4	5	6	7	8	9	10	11	12	13	14	15	16	17	18	19	20	21	22	23	24	25	26	27	28	29	30	31
268	2144	First option: 0x350103: Option 53 (DHCP Message Type) 1 octet (containing DHCPREQUEST)																								Second option:↴							
272	2176	↪0x3204c0a80164: Option 50 (Request IP address) 4 octets (containing 192.168.1.100)																															
276	2208	Third option: 0x3604c0a801601: Option: 54 (DHCP Server) 4 octets (containing 192.168.1.1)↴																															
280	2240	↪DHCP Server cont...								ff																							

=== Acknowledgement ===
When the DHCP server receives the DHCPREQUEST message from the client, the configuration process enters its final phase. The acknowledgement phase involves sending a DHCPACK packet to the client. This packet includes the lease duration and any other configuration information that the client might have requested. At this point, the IP configuration process is completed.

The protocol expects the DHCP client to configure its network interface with the negotiated parameters.

Example Ethernet frame with a DHCPACK message
Offset	Octet	0								1								2								3							
Octet	Bit	0	1	2	3	4	5	6	7	8	9	10	11	12	13	14	15	16	17	18	19	20	21	22	23	24	25	26	27	28	29	30	31
0	0	Destination MAC (00:05:3C:04:8D:59)																															
4	32																																
8	64	Source MAC (B4:0C:25:E3:7D:62)																															
12	96	EtherType (0x0800)																															
16	128	IPv4 packet, containing a UDP PDU with DHCP payload...																															
20	160	IPv4 packet, containing a UDP PDU with DHCP payload...																															
⋮	⋮	IPv4 packet, containing a UDP PDU with DHCP payload...																															
⋮	⋮	Frame Check Sequence																															

IPv4 Header
Offset	Octet	0								1								2								3							
Octet	Bit	0	1	2	3	4	5	6	7	8	9	10	11	12	13	14	15	16	17	18	19	20	21	22	23	24	25	26	27	28	29	30	31
0	0	IPv4 header start																															
4	32	IPv4 header start																															
8	64	TTL								Protocol (17 UDP)								Header Checksum															
12	96	Source Address (192.168.1.1)																															
16	128	Destination Address (192.168.1.100)																															

UDP Header
Offset	Octet	0								1								2								3							
Octet	Bit	0	1	2	3	4	5	6	7	8	9	10	11	12	13	14	15	16	17	18	19	20	21	22	23	24	25	26	27	28	29	30	31
20	160	Source Port (67)																Destination Port (68)															
24	192	Length																Checksum															

DHCP Payload: DHCPACK
Offset	Octet	0								1								2								3							
Octet	Bit	0	1	2	3	4	5	6	7	8	9	10	11	12	13	14	15	16	17	18	19	20	21	22	23	24	25	26	27	28	29	30	31
28	224	OP (0x02)								HTYPE (0x01)								HLEN (0x06)								HOPS (0x00)							
32	256	XID (0x3903F326)																															
36	288	SECS (0x0000)																FLAGS (0x0000)															
40	320	CIADDR (Client IP address: 0x00000000)																															
44	352	YIADDR (Your IP address: 0xC0A80164 or 192.168.1.100)																															
48	384	SIADDR (Server IP address: 0xC0A80101 or 192.168.1.1)																															
52	416	GIADDR (Gateway IP address: 0x00000000)																															
56	448	CHADDR (Client Hardware address: 0x00053C04; 0x8D590000; 0x00000000 0x00000000)																															
60	480	CHADDR (Client Hardware address: 0x00053C04; 0x8D590000; 0x00000000 0x00000000)																															
64	512	CHADDR (Client Hardware address: 0x00053C04; 0x8D590000; 0x00000000 0x00000000)																															
68	544	CHADDR (Client Hardware address: 0x00053C04; 0x8D590000; 0x00000000 0x00000000)																															
72	576	192 octets of 0s, or overflow space for additional options; BOOTP legacy.																															
⋮	⋮	192 octets of 0s, or overflow space for additional options; BOOTP legacy.																															
260	2080	192 octets of 0s, or overflow space for additional options; BOOTP legacy.																															
264	2112	Magic Cookie (0x63825363)																															

DHCP Options (in TLV format)
Offset	Octet	0								1								2								3							
Octet	Bit	0	1	2	3	4	5	6	7	8	9	10	11	12	13	14	15	16	17	18	19	20	21	22	23	24	25	26	27	28	29	30	31
268	2144	First option: 0x350105: Option 53 (DHCP Message Type) 1 octet (containing DHCPACK)																								Second option:↴							
272	2176	↪0x0104ffffff00: Option 1 (Subnet mask) 4 octets (containing 255.255.255.0)																															
276	2208	Third option: 0x0304c0A80101: Option: 3 (Router) 4 octets (containing 192.168.1.1)↴																															
280	2240	↪Router cont...								Fourth option: 0x330400015080: Option 51 (Address time) 4 octets (a 86400 second lease time)↴																							
284	2272	↪Address time cont...																Fifth option:															
288	2304	0x060c09070a0f09070a1009070a13: Option 6 (Domain Server) 14 octets (containing 9.7.10.15,9.7.10.16,9.7.10.18)																															
292	2336	0x060c09070a0f09070a1009070a13: Option 6 (Domain Server) 14 octets (containing 9.7.10.15,9.7.10.16,9.7.10.18)																															
296	2368	0x060c09070a0f09070a1009070a13: Option 6 (Domain Server) 14 octets (containing 9.7.10.15,9.7.10.16,9.7.10.18)																															
300	2400													ff																			

=== Selecting and configuring IP addresses ===
When the server is reusing an IP address from its pool, it may first check (using ping) to see if it is not taken already. This may happen if a host is configured manually with an IP address that lies within the DHCP scope.

Before claiming an IP address, the client should probe the newly received address (e.g. with ARP), in order to find if there is another host present in the network with the proposed IP address. If there is no reply, this address does not conflict with that of another host, so it is free to be used. If this probe finds another computer using that address, the client should broadcast a DHCPDECLINE to the DHCP server(s).

=== Information ===
A DHCP client may request more information than the server sent with the original DHCPOFFER. The client may also request repeat data for a particular application. For example, browsers use DHCP Inform to obtain web proxy settings via WPAD.

=== Releasing ===
The client sends a request to the DHCP server to release the DHCP information and the client deactivates its IP address. As client devices usually do not know when users may unplug them from the network, the protocol does not mandate the sending of DHCP Release.

== Client configuration parameters ==
A DHCP server can provide optional configuration parameters to the client. RFC 2132 describes the available DHCP options defined by Internet Assigned Numbers Authority (IANA) - DHCP and BOOTP PARAMETERS.

A DHCP client can select, manipulate and overwrite parameters provided by a DHCP server. In Unix-like systems this client-level refinement typically takes place according to the values in the configuration file /etc/dhclient.conf.

== Options ==
Options are octet strings of varying length. This is called Type–length–value encoding. The first octet is the option code, the second octet is the number of following octets and the remaining octets are code dependent. For example, the DHCP message-type option for an offer would appear as 0x35, 0x01, 0x02, where 0x35 is code 53 for "DHCP message type", 0x01 means one octet follows and 0x02 is the value of "offer".

The following tables list the available DHCP options.

RFC 1497 (BOOTP Vendor Information Extensions) vendor extensions
Code	Name	Length	Notes
0	Pad	0 octets	Can be used to pad other options so that they are aligned to the word boundary; is not followed by length byte
1	Subnet mask	4 octets	Client's subnet mask as per RFC 950. If both the subnet mask and the router option (option 3) are included, the subnet mask option must be first.
2	Time offset	4 octets	Time offset of the client's subnet in seconds from Coordinated Universal Time (UTC). The offset is expressed as a two's complement 32-bit integer. A positive offset indicates a location east of the zero meridian and a negative offset indicates a location west of the zero meridian.
3	Router	Multiples of 4 octets	Available routers, should be listed in order of preference
4	Time server	Multiples of 4 octets	Available Time Protocol servers to synchronise with, should be listed in order of preference
5	Name server	Multiples of 4 octets	Available IEN 116 name servers, should be listed in order of preference
6	Domain name server	Multiples of 4 octets	Available DNS servers, should be listed in order of preference
7	Log server	Multiples of 4 octets	Available log servers, should be listed in order of preference
8	Cookie server	Multiples of 4 octets	Cookie in this case means "fortune cookie" or "quote of the day", a pithy or humorous anecdote often sent as part of a logon process on large computers; it has nothing to do with cookies sent by websites.
9	LPR Server	Multiples of 4 octets	A list of Line Printer Daemon protocol servers available to the client, should be listed in order of preference
10	Impress server	Multiples of 4 octets	A list of Imagen Impress servers available to the client, should be listed in order of preference
11	Resource location server	Multiples of 4 octets	A list of Resource Location Protocol servers available to the client, should be listed in order of preference
12	Host name	Minimum of 1 octet	Name of the client. The name may be qualified with the local domain name.
13	Boot file size	2 octets	Length of the boot image in 512B blocks
14	Merit dump file	Minimum of 1 octet	Path where crash dumps should be stored
15	Domain name	Minimum of 1 octet	
16	Swap server	4 octets	The IP address of a server where a swap service (e.g., swap over NFS) is provided for diskless workstations
17	Root path	Minimum of 1 octet	The path in the remote filesystem specified by siaddr or sname that the client should mount as its root filesystem (e.g, over NFS)
18	Extensions path	Minimum of 1 octet	
255	End	0 octets	Used to mark the end of the vendor option field

IP layer parameters per host
Code	Name	Length	Notes
19	IP forwarding enable/disable	1 octet	
20	Non-local source routing enable/disable	1 octet	
21	Policy filter	Multiples of 8 octets	
22	Maximum datagram reassembly size	2 octets	
23	Default IP time-to-live	1 octet	
24	Path MTU aging timeout	4 octets	
25	Path MTU plateau table	Multiples of 2 octets	

IP Layer Parameters per Interface
Code	Name	Length	Notes
26	Interface MTU	2 octets	
27	All subnets are local	1 octet	
28	Broadcast address	4 octets	
29	Perform mask discovery	1 octet	
30	Mask supplier	1 octet	
31	Perform router discovery	1 octet	
32	Router solicitation address	4 octets	
33	Static route	Multiples of 8 octets	A list of destination/router pairs

Link layer parameters per interface
Code	Name	Length	Notes
34	Trailer encapsulation option	1 octet	
35	ARP cache timeout	4 octets	
36	Ethernet encapsulation	1 octet	

TCP parameters
Code	Name	Length	Notes
37	TCP default TTL	1 octet	
38	TCP keepalive interval	4 octets	
39	TCP keepalive garbage	1 octet	

Application and service parameters
Code	Name	Length	Notes
40	Network information service domain	Minimum of 1 octet	
41	Network information servers	Multiples of 4 octets	
42	Network Time Protocol (NTP) servers	Multiples of 4 octets	
43	Vendor-specific information	Minimum of 1 octets	
44	NetBIOS over TCP/IP name server	Multiples of 4 octets	
45	NetBIOS over TCP/IP datagram Distribution Server	Multiples of 4 octets	
46	NetBIOS over TCP/IP node type	1 octet	
47	NetBIOS over TCP/IP scope	Minimum of 1 octet	
48	X Window System font server	Multiples of 4 octets	
49	X Window System display manager	Multiples of 4 octets	
64	Network Information Service+ domain	Minimum of 1 octet	
65	Network Information Service+ servers	Multiples of 4 octets	
68	Mobile IP home agent	Multiples of 4 octets	
69	Simple Mail Transfer Protocol (SMTP) server	Multiples of 4 octets	
70	Post Office Protocol (POP3) server	Multiples of 4 octets	
71	Network News Transfer Protocol (NNTP) server	Multiples of 4 octets	
72	Default World Wide Web (WWW) server	Multiples of 4 octets	
73	Default Finger protocol server	Multiples of 4 octets	
74	Default Internet Relay Chat (IRC) server	Multiples of 4 octets	
75	StreetTalk server	Multiples of 4 octets	
76	StreetTalk Directory Assistance (STDA) server	Multiples of 4 octets	

DHCP extensions
Code	Name	Length	Notes
50	Requested IP address	4 octets	
51	IP address lease time	4 octets	
52	Option overload	1 octet	
53	DHCP message type	1 octet	
54	Server identifier	4 octets	
55	Parameter request list	Minimum of 1 octet	
56	Message	Minimum of 1 octet	
57	Maximum DHCP message size	2 octets	
58	Renewal (T1) time value	4 octets	
59	Rebinding (T2) time value	4 octets	
60	Vendor class identifier	Minimum of 1 octet	
61	Client identifier	Minimum of 2 octets	
66	TFTP server name	Minimum of 1 octet	
67	Bootfile name	Minimum of 1 octet	

=== DHCP message types ===
This table lists the DHCP message types. These codes are the value in the DHCP extension 53, shown in the table above.

DHCP message types
Code	Name	Length	RFC
1	DHCPDISCOVER	1 octet	2132
2	DHCPOFFER	1 octet	2132
3	DHCPREQUEST	1 octet	2132
4	DHCPDECLINE	1 octet	2132
5	DHCPACK	1 octet	2132
6	DHCPNAK	1 octet	2132
7	DHCPRELEASE	1 octet	2132
8	DHCPINFORM	1 octet	2132
9	DHCPFORCERENEW	1 octet	3203
10	DHCPLEASEQUERY	1 octet	4388
11	DHCPLEASEUNASSIGNED	1 octet	4388
12	DHCPLEASEUNKNOWN	1 octet	4388
13	DHCPLEASEACTIVE	1 octet	4388
14	DHCPBULKLEASEQUERY	1 octet	6926
15	DHCPLEASEQUERYDONE	1 octet	6926
16	DHCPACTIVELEASEQUERY	1 octet	7724
17	DHCPLEASEQUERYSTATUS	1 octet	7724
18	DHCPTLS	1 octet	7724

==== Client vendor identification ====
An option exists to identify the vendor and functionality of a DHCP client. The information is a variable-length string of characters or octets which has a meaning specified by the vendor of the DHCP client. One method by which a DHCP client can communicate to the server that it is using a certain type of hardware or firmware is to set a value in its DHCP requests called the Vendor Class Identifier (VCI) (Option 60).

The value to which this option is set gives the DHCP server a hint about any required extra information that this client needs in a DHCP response. Some types of set-top boxes set the VCI to inform the DHCP server about the hardware type and functionality of the device. An Aruba campus wireless access point, for example, supplies value 'ArubaAP' as option 60 in its DHCPDISCOVER message. The DHCP server can then augment its DHCPOFFER with an IP address of an Aruba wireless controller in option 43, so the access point knows where to register itself.

Setting a VCI by the client allows a DHCP server to differentiate between client machines and process the requests from them appropriately.

=== Other extensions ===
Documented DHCP options
Code	Name	Length	RFC
77	User Class	Minimum of 2 octets	3004
82	Relay agent information	Minimum of 2 octets	3046
85	Novell Directory Service (NDS) servers	Minimum of 4 octets, multiple of 4 octets	2241
86	NDS tree name	Variable	2241
87	NDS context	Variable	2241
100	Time zone, POSIX style	Variable	4833
101	Time zone, tz database style	Variable	4833
114	DHCP Captive Portal	Variable	8910
119	Domain search	Variable	3397
121	Classless static route	Variable	3442
209	Configuration File	Variable	5071
210	Path Prefix	Variable	5071
211	Reboot Time	Variable	5071
224–254	site-specific options	Variable	3942

==== Relay agent information sub-options ====
The relay agent information option (option 82) specifies container for attaching sub-options to DHCP requests transmitted between a DHCP relay and a DHCP server.

Relay agent sub-options
Code	Name	Length	RFC
1	Agent Circuit ID	Minimum of 1 octet	3046
2	Agent Remote ID	Minimum of 1 octet	3046
4	Data-Over-Cable Service Interface Specifications (DOCSIS) device class	4 octets	3256
5	Link Selection	4 octets	3527

== Relaying ==
In small networks, where only one IP subnet is being managed, DHCP clients communicate directly with DHCP servers. However, DHCP servers can also provide IP addresses for multiple subnets. In this case, a DHCP client that has not yet acquired an IP address cannot communicate directly with a DHCP server not on the same subnet, as the client's broadcast can only be received on its own subnet.

In order to allow DHCP clients on subnets not directly served by DHCP servers to communicate with DHCP servers, DHCP relay agents can be installed on these subnets. A DHCP relay agent runs on a network device, capable of routing between the client's subnet and the subnet of the DHCP server. The DHCP client broadcasts on the local link; the relay agent receives the broadcast and transmits it to one or more DHCP servers using unicast. The IP addresses of the DHCP servers are manually configured in the relay agent. The relay agent stores its own IP address, from the interface on which it has received the client's broadcast, in the GIADDR field of the DHCP packet. The DHCP server uses the GIADDR-value to determine the subnet, and subsequently the corresponding address pool, from which to allocate an IP address. When the DHCP server replies to the client, it sends the reply to the GIADDR-address, again using unicast. The relay agent then retransmits the response on the local network, using unicast (in most cases) to the newly reserved IP address, in an Ethernet frame directed to the client's MAC address. The client should accept the packet as its own, even when that IP address is not yet set on the interface. Directly after processing the packet, the client sets the IP address on its interface and is ready for regular IP communication, directly thereafter.

If the client's implementation of the IP stack does not accept unicast packets when it has no IP address yet, the client may set the broadcast bit in the FLAGS field when sending a DHCPDISCOVER packet. The relay agent will use the 255.255.255.255 broadcast IP address (and the clients MAC address) to inform the client of the server's DHCPOFFER.

The communication between the relay agent and the DHCP server typically uses both a source and destination UDP port of 67.

== Client states ==
A simplified DHCP client state-transition diagram based on figure 5 of RFC 2131

A DHCP client can receive these messages from a server:

- DHCPOFFER
- DHCPACK
- DHCPNAK

The client moves through DHCP states depending on how the server responds to the messages that the client sends.

== Reliability ==
The DHCP ensures reliability in several ways: periodic renewal, rebinding, and failover. DHCP clients are allocated leases that last for some period of time. Clients begin to attempt to renew their leases once half the lease interval has expired. They do this by sending a unicast DHCPREQUEST message to the DHCP server that granted the original lease. If that server is down or unreachable, it will fail to respond to the DHCPREQUEST. However, in that case the client repeats the DHCPREQUEST from time to time, (Note: The RFC calls for the client to wait one half of the remaining time until T2 before it retransmits the DHCPREQUEST packet) so if the DHCP server comes back up or becomes reachable again, the DHCP client will succeed in contacting it and renew the lease.

If the DHCP server is unreachable for an extended period of time, the DHCP client will attempt to rebind, by broadcasting its DHCPREQUEST rather than unicasting it. Because it is broadcast, the DHCPREQUEST message will reach all available DHCP servers. If some other DHCP server is able to renew the lease, it will do so at this time.

In order for rebinding to work, when the client successfully contacts a backup DHCP server, that server must have accurate information about the client's binding. Maintaining accurate binding information between two servers is a complicated problem; if both servers are able to update the same lease database, there must be a mechanism to avoid conflicts between updates on the independent servers. A proposal for implementing fault-tolerant DHCP servers was submitted to the Internet Engineering Task Force, but never formalized. (Note: The proposal provided a mechanism whereby two servers could remain loosely in sync with each other in such a way that even in the event of a total failure of one server, the other server could recover the lease database and continue operating. Due to the length and complexity of the specification, it was never published as a standard; however, the techniques described in the proposal are in wide use, with open-source and several commercial implementations.)

If rebinding fails, the lease will eventually expire. When the lease expires, the client must stop using the IP address granted to it in its lease. At that time it will restart the DHCP process from the beginning by broadcasting a DHCPDISCOVER message. Since its lease has expired, it will accept any IP address offered to it. Once it has a new IP address (presumably from a different DHCP server) it will once again be able to use the network. However, since its IP address has changed, any ongoing connections will be broken.

== IPv6 networks ==
The basic methodology of DHCP was developed for networks based on Internet Protocol version 4 (IPv4). Since the development and deployment of IPv6 networks, DHCP has also been used for assigning parameters in such networks, despite the inherent features of IPv6 for stateless address autoconfiguration. The IPv6 version of the protocol is designated as DHCPv6.

== Security ==
The base DHCP does not include any mechanism for authentication. Because of this, it is vulnerable to a variety of attacks. These attacks fall into three main categories:

- Unauthorized DHCP servers providing false information to clients.
- Unauthorized clients gaining access to resources.
- Resource exhaustion attacks from malicious DHCP clients.

Because the client has no way to validate the identity of a DHCP server, unauthorized DHCP servers (commonly called "rogue DHCP") can be operated on networks, providing incorrect information to DHCP clients. This can serve either as a denial-of-service attack, preventing the client from gaining access to network connectivity, or as a man-in-the-middle attack. Because the DHCP server provides the DHCP client with server IP addresses, such as the IP address of one or more DNS servers, an attacker can convince a DHCP client to do its DNS lookups through its own DNS server, and can therefore provide its own answers to DNS queries from the client. This in turn allows the attacker to redirect network traffic through itself, allowing it to eavesdrop on connections between the client and network servers it contacts, or to simply replace those network servers with its own.

Because the DHCP server has no secure mechanism for authenticating the client, clients can gain unauthorized access to IP addresses by presenting credentials, such as client identifiers, that belong to other DHCP clients. This also allows DHCP clients to exhaust the DHCP server's store of IP addresses—by presenting new credentials each time it asks for an address, the client can consume all the available IP addresses on a particular network link, preventing other DHCP clients from getting service.

DHCP does provide some mechanisms for mitigating these problems. The Relay Agent Information Option protocol extension (usually referred to in the industry by its actual number as Option 82) allows network operators to attach tags to DHCP messages as these messages arrive on the network operator's trusted network. This tag is then used as an authorization token to control the client's access to network resources. Because the client has no access to the network upstream of the relay agent, the lack of authentication does not prevent the DHCP server operator from relying on the authorization token.

Another extension, Authentication for DHCP Messages (RFC 3118), provides a mechanism for authenticating DHCP messages. As of 2002, this extension had not seen widespread adoption because of the problems of managing keys for large numbers of DHCP clients. A 2007 book about DSL technologies remarked that:

[T]here were numerous security vulnerabilities identified against the security measures proposed by RFC 3118. This fact, combined with the introduction of 802.1X, slowed the deployment and take-rate of authenticated DHCP, and it has never been widely deployed.

A 2010 book notes that:

[T]here have been very few implementations of DHCP Authentication. The challenges of key management and processing delays due to hash computation have been deemed too heavy a price to pay for the perceived benefits.

Architectural proposals from 2008 involve authenticating DHCP requests using 802.1X or PANA (both of which transport EAP). An IETF proposal was made for including EAP in DHCP itself, the so-called EAPoDHCP; this does not appear to have progressed beyond IETF draft level, the last of which dates to 2010.

== IETF standards documents ==
- RFC 2131 – "Dynamic Host Configuration Protocol," Draft Standard.
- RFC 2132 – "DHCP Options and BOOTP Vendor Extensions," Draft Standard.
- RFC 3046 – "DHCP Relay Agent Information Option," Proposed Standard.
- RFC 3203 – "DHCP reconfigure extension," Proposed Standard.
- RFC 3397 – "Dynamic Host Configuration Protocol (DHCP) Domain Search Option," Proposed Standard.
- RFC 3442 – "The Classless Static Route Option for Dynamic Host Configuration Protocol (DHCP) version 4," Proposed Standard.
- RFC 3942 – "Reclassifying Dynamic Host Configuration Protocol version 4 (DHCPv4) Options," Proposed Standard.
- RFC 4361 – "Node-specific Client Identifiers for Dynamic Host Configuration Protocol Version Four (DHCPv4)," Proposed Standard.
- RFC 4388 – "Dynamic Host Configuration Protocol (DHCP) Leasequery," Proposed Standard.
- RFC 4436 – "Detecting Network Attachment in IPv4 (DNAv4)," Proposed Standard.
- RFC 6926 – "DHCPv4 Bulk Leasequery," Proposed Standard.
- RFC 7724 – "Active DHCPv4 Lease Query," Proposed Standard.
- RFC 8415 – "Dynamic Host Configuration Protocol for IPv6 (DHCPv6)," Proposed Standard.

== See also ==
- Boot Service Discovery Protocol (BSDP) – a DHCP extension used by Apple's NetBoot
- Comparison of DHCP server software
- K. van den Hout; A. Koopal; R. van Mook (1 April 1998). Management of IP numbers by peg-dhcp. Network Working Group. doi:10.17487/RFC2322. RFC 2322. Informational. This is an April Fools' Day Request for Comments.
- Preboot Execution Environment (PXE)
- Reverse Address Resolution Protocol (RARP)
- Rogue DHCP
- UDP Helper Address – a tool for routing DHCP requests across subnet boundaries
- Zeroconf – Zero Configuration Networking
- Kea – an open-source DHCP server developed by the Internet Systems Consortium
