= 1994 Black Hawk shootdown incident =

US friendly fire incident over Iraq

- Part of Operation Provide Comfort of the Iraqi no-fly zones
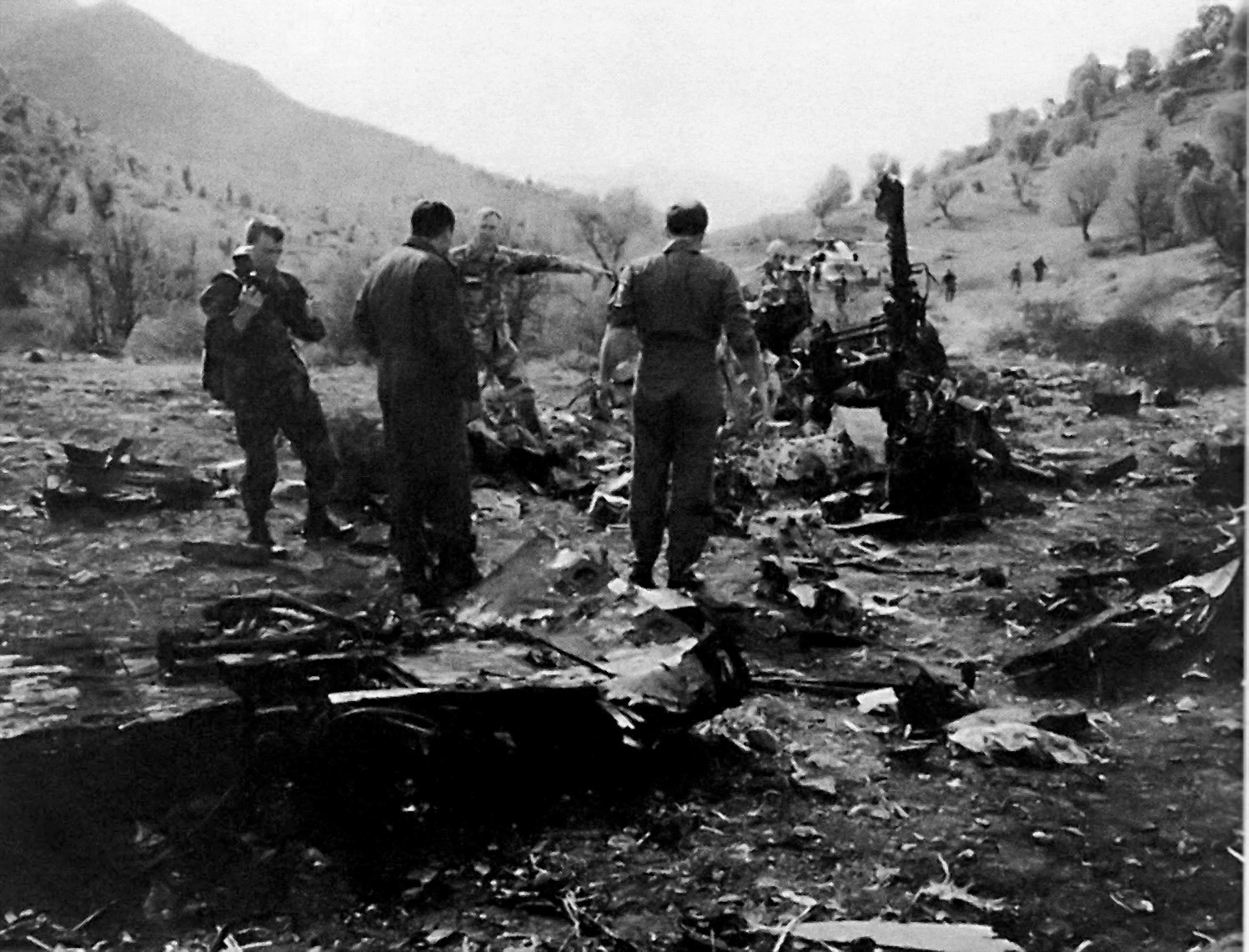
- U.S. military personnel inspect the wreckage of one of the two American UH-60 Black Hawks shot down in the 1994 Black Hawk shootdown incident in northern Iraq.
Date	14 April 1994
Location	Erbil, Arbil Governorate, Iraq 36°46′N 44°06′E
Result	Two U.S. Army UH-60 Black Hawks destroyed, all 26 military and civilian personnel aboard killed.

The 1994 Black Hawk shootdown incident, sometimes referred to as the Black Hawk Incident, was a friendly fire incident over northern Iraq that occurred on 14 April 1994 during Operation Provide Comfort (OPC). The pilots of two United States Air Force (USAF) F-15 fighter aircraft, operating under the control of a USAF airborne warning and control system (AWACS) aircraft, misidentified two U.S. Army UH-60 Black Hawk helicopters as Iraqi Mil Mi-24 "Hind" helicopters. The F-15 pilots fired on and destroyed both helicopters, killing all 26 military and civilians aboard, including personnel from the U.S., United Kingdom, France, Turkey, and the Kurdish community.

A subsequent USAF investigation blamed the accident on several factors. The F-15 pilots were faulted for misidentifying the helicopters as hostile. Also, the crew members of the AWACS aircraft were blamed for their inaction in failing to exercise appropriate control and for not intervening in the situation. In addition, the identification friend or foe (IFF) systems had not functioned to identify the helicopters to the F-15 pilots. Furthermore, USAF leaders had failed to adequately integrate U.S. Army helicopter operations into overall OPC air operations. As a result of the investigation, several USAF officers received administrative discipline, but only one, Jim Wang, an AWACS crew member, was tried by court-martial, in which he was acquitted.

As a result of complaints by family members of the victims and others that the military was failing to hold its personnel accountable, the U.S. Senate and U.S. House conducted their own investigations into the shootdown and the U.S. military's response to it. Also, Ronald R. Fogleman, the USAF's new Chief of Staff, conducted his own review of the actions taken by the USAF against the officers involved in the incident.

Fogleman's investigation led to several of the officers involved in the incident receiving further administrative discipline. The U.S. Department of Defense (DoD) subsequently refused U.S. Senate subpoenas for four USAF officers to be interviewed for the Senate investigation, which was never publicly released. The U.S. House investigation, conducted in part by the Government Accountability Office (GAO), found that the military investigative and judicial systems had operated mostly as designed, but also noted that the DoD had refused access to key witnesses.

== Background ==
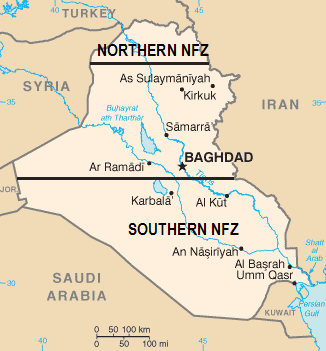
Map of the no-fly zones in Iraq after the Gulf War. Operation Provide Comfort took place in the northern no-fly zone, labeled as "NORTHERN NFZ" on the map

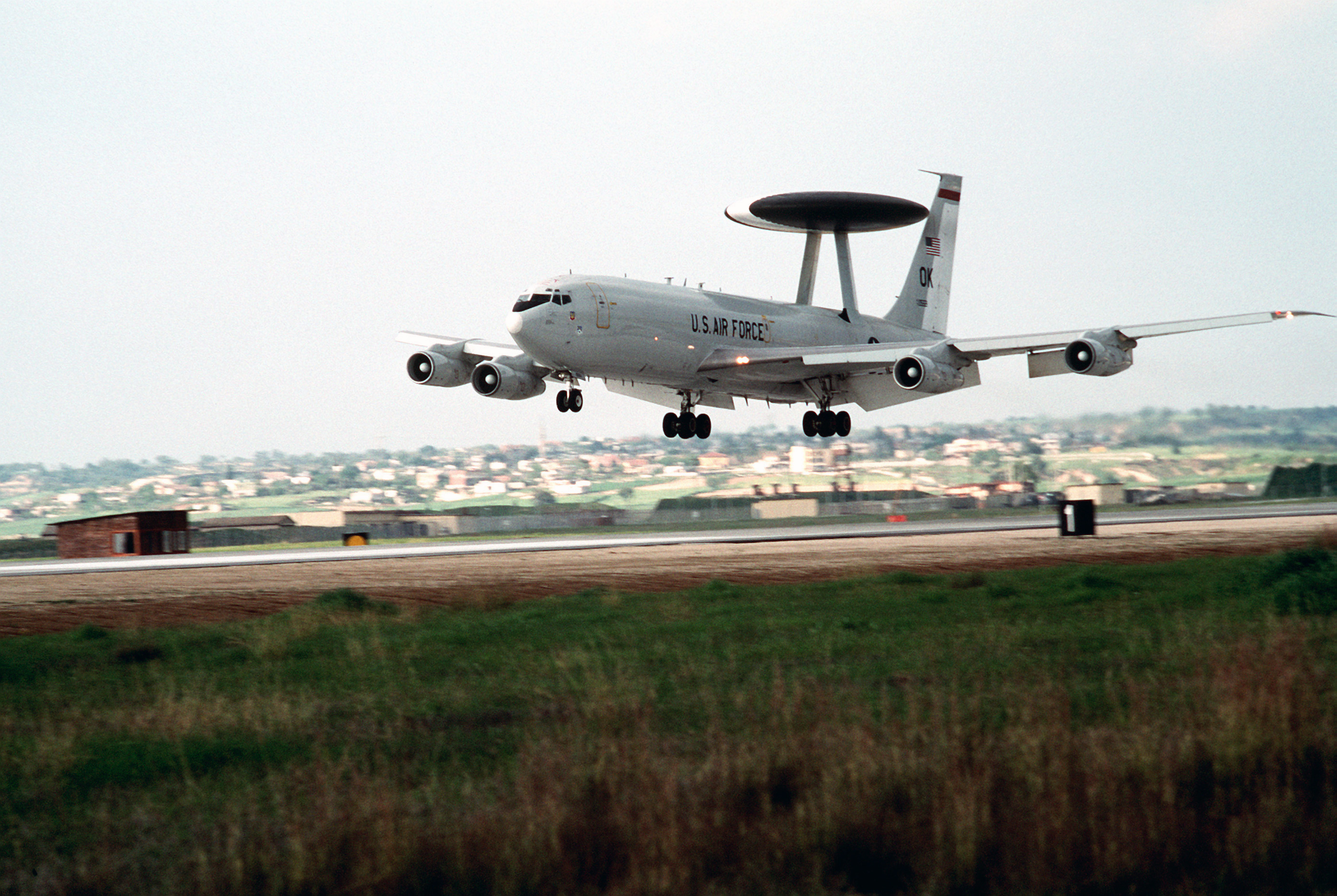
An AWACS aircraft operates out of Incirlik Air Base during OPC

On 7 April 1991, Iraq accepted United Nations (UN) ceasefire conditions and resolutions, thereby officially ending the Gulf War. This same day, a large multinational, multiagency humanitarian effort under the authority of UN Security Council Resolution No. 688 began to aid the approximately 500,000 Kurdish refugees who had fled from Iraqi military forces into the hills of northern Iraq. On 18 April 1991, John Shalikashvili took command of the U.S.-led operation to ensure security for UN relief operations and the Kurdish refugees, called Operation Provide Comfort (OPC).

OPC took place in an area of northern Iraq above the 36th parallel. This area, approximately 160 by 70 kilometres (99 by 43 mi) in size, was designated a "no-fly" security zone by UN coalition forces, enforced by a combined task force (CTF) of daily armed aircraft patrols from participating nations, including the United Kingdom, France, Turkey, and the United States. The United States Army was tasked with assisting civilian relief agencies to build communities and facilities for the Kurds in Northern Iraq. Over the next three years, 27,000 fixed-wing and 1,400 helicopter coalition flights took place in the zone to support humanitarian operations without interference from Iraqi aircraft or other military units.

In April 1994, OPC was co-commanded by USAF Brigadier General Jeffrey Pilkington. The OPC combined air forces were commanded by Colonel Curtis H. Emery, USAF. Colonel Douglas J. Richardson, USAF, was the director of operations for the combined air forces.

== Incident ==
On 14 April 1994, at 07:36 local time, a USAF E-3 AWACS aircraft from the 963d Airborne Air Control Squadron (based at Tinker Air Force Base, Oklahoma) departed Incirlik Air Base (AB), Turkey in support of OPC. The AWACS, with its 19-member crew under the mission crew command of Major Lawrence Tracy, was to provide airborne threat warning and air control for all OPC aircraft during its time aloft. The AWACS crew reported on station at its assigned surveillance orbit altitude of 32,000 feet (9,750 m) located inside Turkey just north of the northern border of Iraq at 08:45. The weather that day was fair and clear over northern Iraq.

At 08:22, two U.S. Army UH-60 Black Hawk helicopters from the 6th Battalion, 159th Aviation Regiment (based in Giebelstadt, Germany), called Eagle Flight, departed Diyarbakır, near Pirinçlik Air Base, Turkey, headed for the OPC military coordination center (MCC) located 150 miles (240 km) away in Zakhu, Iraq. Both helicopters were fitted with external, 230-US-gallon (870 L) fuel tanks on sponsons mounted beside each side door with each tank emblazoned with large American flags. In addition to the flags on the fuel tanks, each helicopter was marked with American flags on each side door, on the nose, and on the belly. The lead Black Hawk was piloted by U.S. Army Captain Patrick McKenna, commander of the Eagle Flight detachment of six helicopters.

At 09:21, the Black Hawks reported their entry into the no-fly zone by radio on the en route frequency to the AWACS en route controller, Lieutenant Joseph Halcli, and then landed six minutes later at the MCC. Halcli and his superior officer, Captain Jim Wang, the AWACS's senior director, added "friendly helicopter" tags to their radar scopes, noted that both helicopters were displaying identification friend or foe (IFF) Mode I and Mode II signals, and then suspended the radar symbols after the Black Hawks disappeared from their scopes upon landing at the MCC at 09:24. Although the helicopters were squawking (signaling) the wrong IFF Mode I code for the no-fly zone (called the Tactical Area of Responsibility or TAOR), neither Wang nor Halcli informed the Black Hawk pilots of that (both helicopters, however, were squawking the correct Mode II codes). Wang and Halcli also neglected to direct the Black Hawks to begin using the TAOR radio frequency instead of the en route frequency.

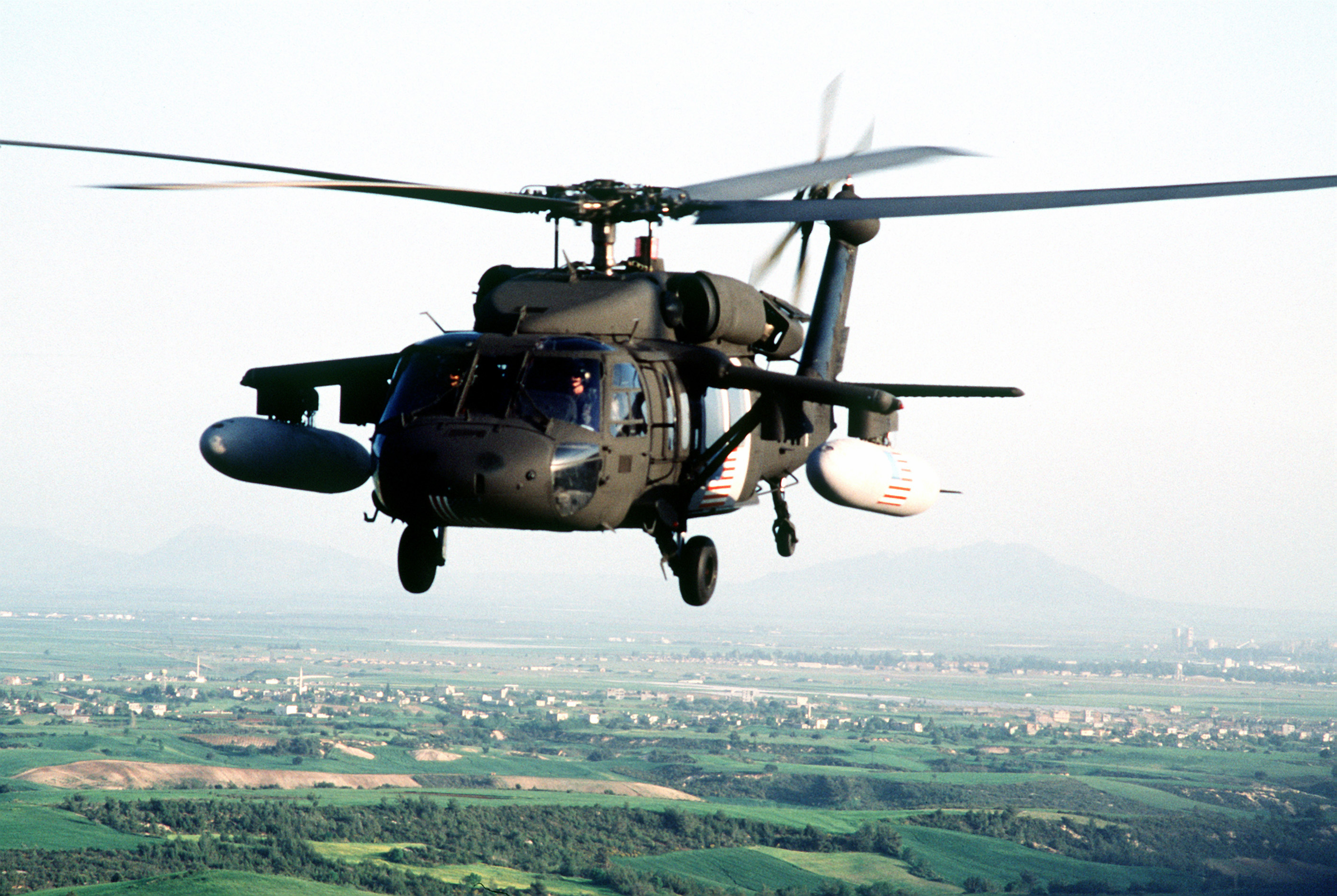
An OPC Eagle Flight Black Hawk with external fuel tanks

At the MCC, the Black Hawks picked up 16 members of the UN Provide Comfort coalition leadership team including four Kurdish civilians, one Assyrian civilian, three Turkish, two British, and one French military officer, plus five U.S. civilian and military officials. At 09:54, the helicopters departed the MCC for Erbil, Iraq, a distance of 120 miles (190 km). The Black Hawks reported their departure, flight route, and destinations by radio which was acknowledged by Halcli. Halcli then re-initiated the friendly helicopter track on his scope. Two of the Black Hawk passengers were Colonel Jerry Thompson, U.S. Army, commander of the MCC, and his replacement, Colonel Richard Mulhern, U.S. Army. At Arbil and later at Salah ad Din, Iraq, Thompson planned to introduce Mulhern to two prominent Kurdish leaders, Masoud Barzani and Jalal Talabani, as well as to UN representatives. Halcli placed tags on his radar screen to show the two Black Hawks' track and notified Wang of the helicopters' movement. In addition to Halcli's screen, the friendly helicopter symbols were visible on the radar screens of Wang, Tracy, and USAF Major Doug Martin. Martin was the "Duke" or "ACE" airborne command element on the AWACS, meaning he was a rated aircrew member assigned to the crew to ensure that all engagement (combat) mandates were adhered to and executed as written in OPC policies.

En route to Arbil, at 10:12, the Black Hawks entered mountainous terrain and their radar returns disappeared from the AWACS's scopes. Captain Dierdre Bell, an air surveillance officer on the AWACS, noticed that the Black Hawks' radar and IFF returns had disappeared and sent an electronic "attention arrow" to Wang's scope. Wang took no action and the large blinking green arrow automatically disappeared from his screen after one minute.

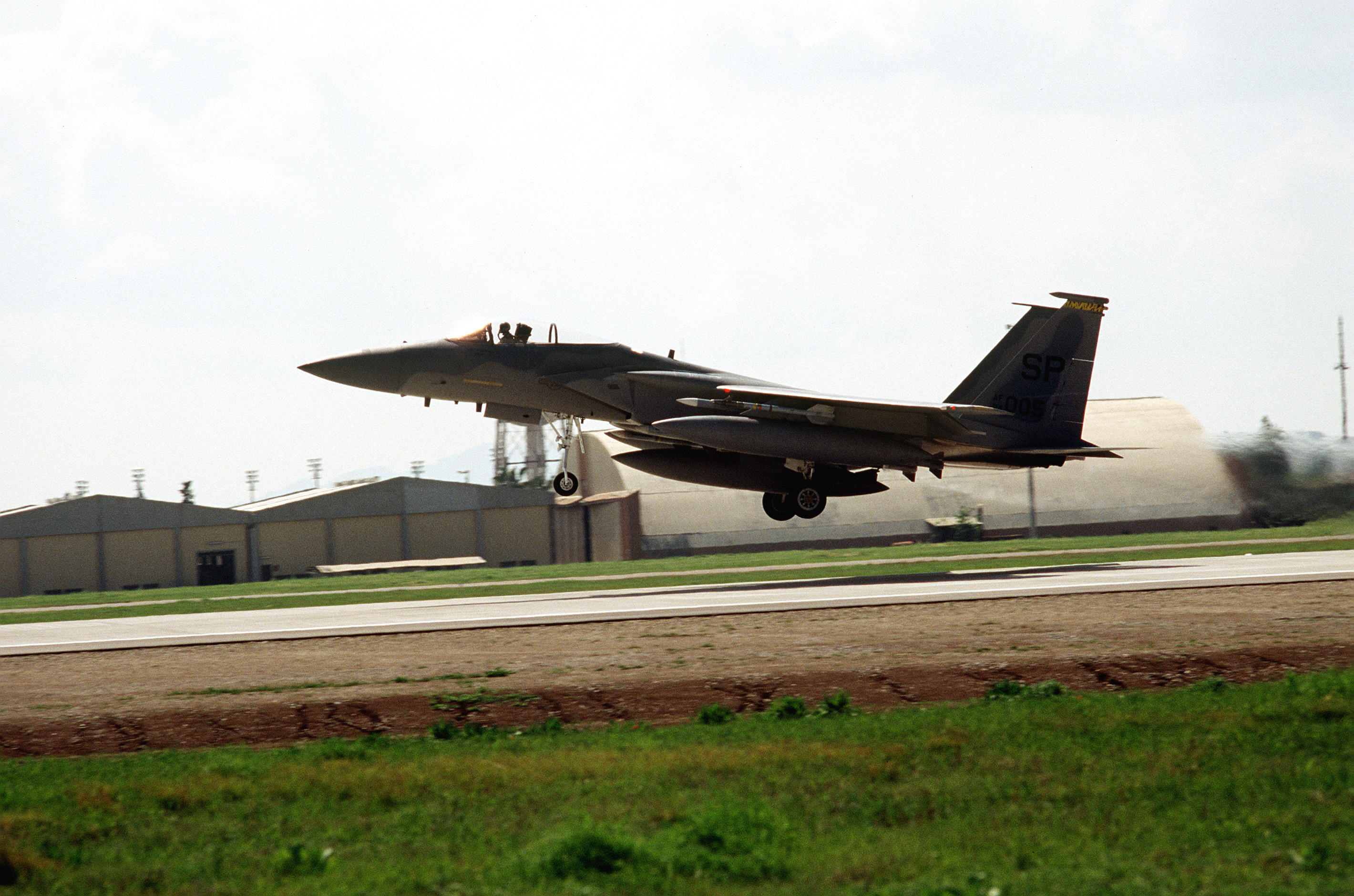
An F-15 fighter departs Incirlik Air Base during OPC

Meanwhile, at 09:35, two USAF F-15C fighter aircraft from the 53d Fighter Squadron, piloted by Captain Eric Wickson and Lieutenant Colonel Randy W. May, departed Incirlik AB. Their mission was to perform an initial fighter sweep of the TAOR to clear the area of any hostile aircraft prior to the entry of coalition forces. The air tasking order (ATO) that was supposed to list all scheduled coalition aircraft missions for that day and which the two pilots reviewed before takeoff, mentioned that U.S. Army Black Hawk helicopters would be operating in the TAOR but did not list takeoff times, routes, or flight durations for them. At 10:15, Wickson radioed Martin on the AWACS and asked if he had any information to pass to them to which Martin replied in the negative.

At 10:20, Wickson, the F-15C flight lead, reported entering northern Iraq to the AWACS controller responsible for air traffic inside the TAOR, USAF Lieutenant Ricky Wilson. The TAOR frequency the F-15s were using was different from the en-route frequency being used by the two Black Hawks. Wilson, however, was monitoring both frequencies and was able to see both Black Hawks on his radar scope before they disappeared at 10:12. Neither Wilson nor any of the other AWACS crew members, many of whom were monitoring the F-15s' radio frequency, informed the F-15s that Black Hawks were currently operating in the TAOR. At 10:21, Wilson, believing the Black Hawks had landed again, asked Wang if he could drop the friendly helicopter symbols from the AWACS's scopes and Wang approved the request. An AWACS crew instructor, Captain Mark Cathy, who was on the mission to assist the AWACS crew and supervise Wilson on this, his first mission into the TAOR, had retired to the back of the airplane at 10:00 to take a nap.

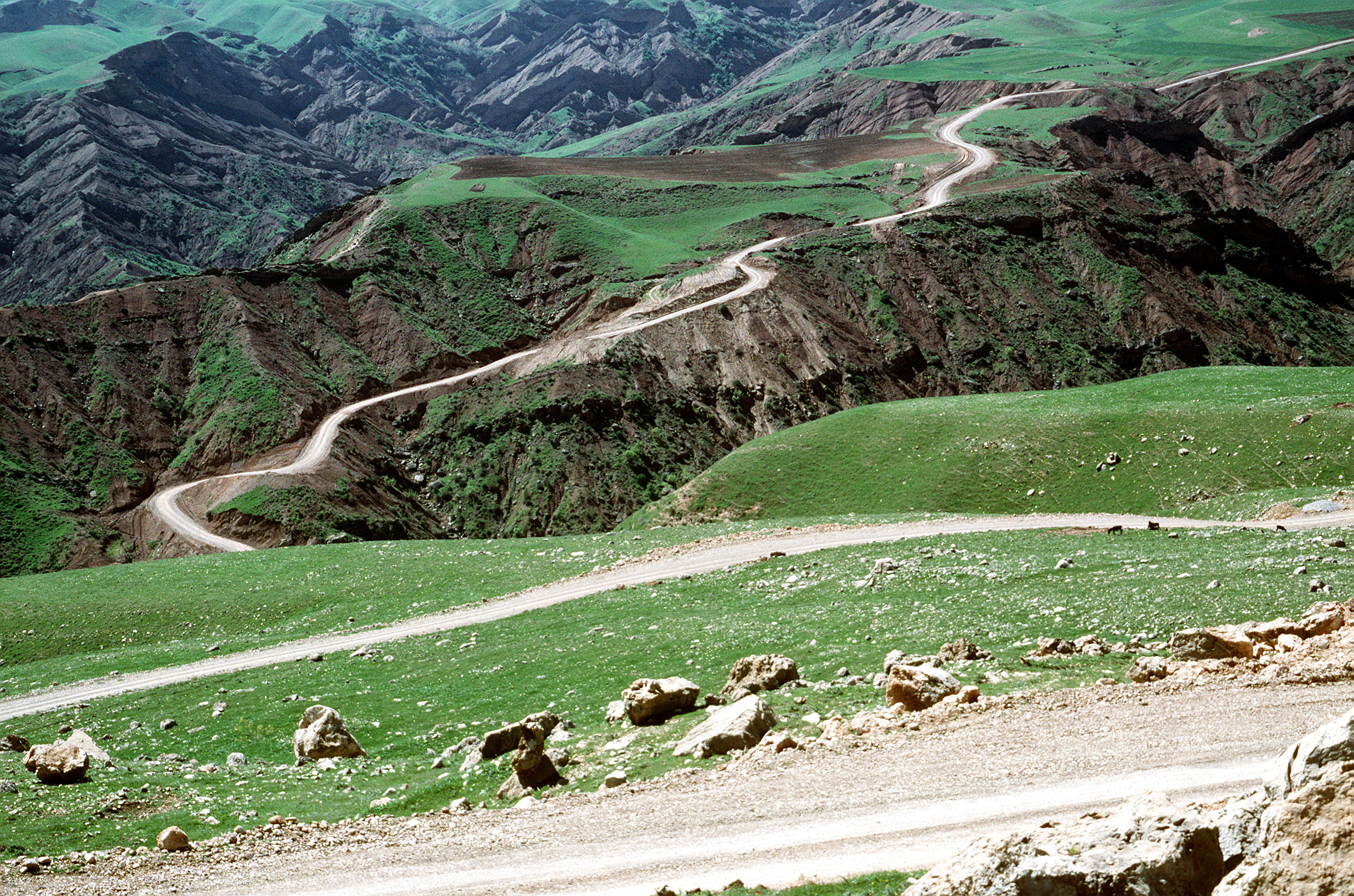
Northern Iraqi terrain similar to that in which the incident occurred

At 10:22, Wickson, flying at 27,000 feet (8,230 m), reported a radar contact on a low-flying, slow-moving aircraft 40 miles (64 km) southeast of his current position. Wilson acknowledged Wickson's report with a "clear there" response, meaning he had no radar contacts in that area. Unknown to the two F-15 pilots, the unidentified aircraft were the two U.S. Army Black Hawks. Contrary to standard procedure, neither Tracy nor Wang spoke up at this point to request that the AWACS crew members attempt to identify the F-15s' radar contacts.

Both F-15 pilots then electronically interrogated the radar target with their on-board IFF systems across two different modes (Mode I and Mode IV). Their IFF systems responded negatively to the attempt to identify the contact on Mode I. The Mode IV momentarily gave a positive response, but thereafter responded negatively and the F-15s moved to intercept the unidentified aircraft. Intermittent IFF Mode I and Mode II returns from the Black Hawks now began to show on Wilson's and other AWACS crew members' scopes and friendly helicopter symbols reappeared on Wang's scope. After closing to 20 miles (32 km) of the radar contacts, at 10:25 the F-15s again reported the contact to the AWACS and Wilson this time responded that he now had a radar contact at that reported location. Although the Black Hawk intermittent radar and now steady IFF returns on the AWACS scopes were in the same location as the unidentified contacts being tracked by the F-15s, none of the AWACS controllers advised Wickson or May that the contacts they were tracking might be friendly helicopters.

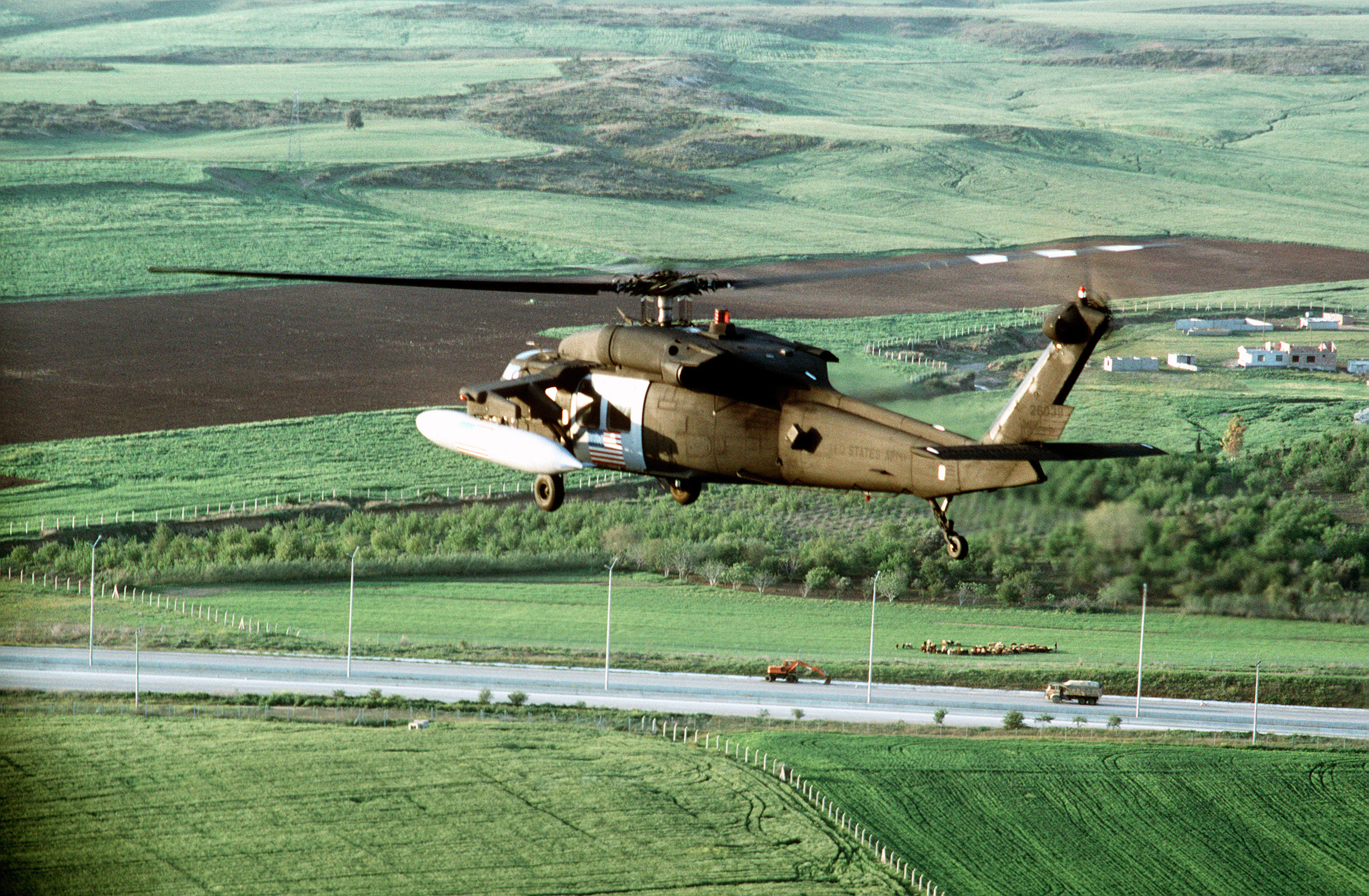
An Eagle Flight Black Hawk as seen from the side

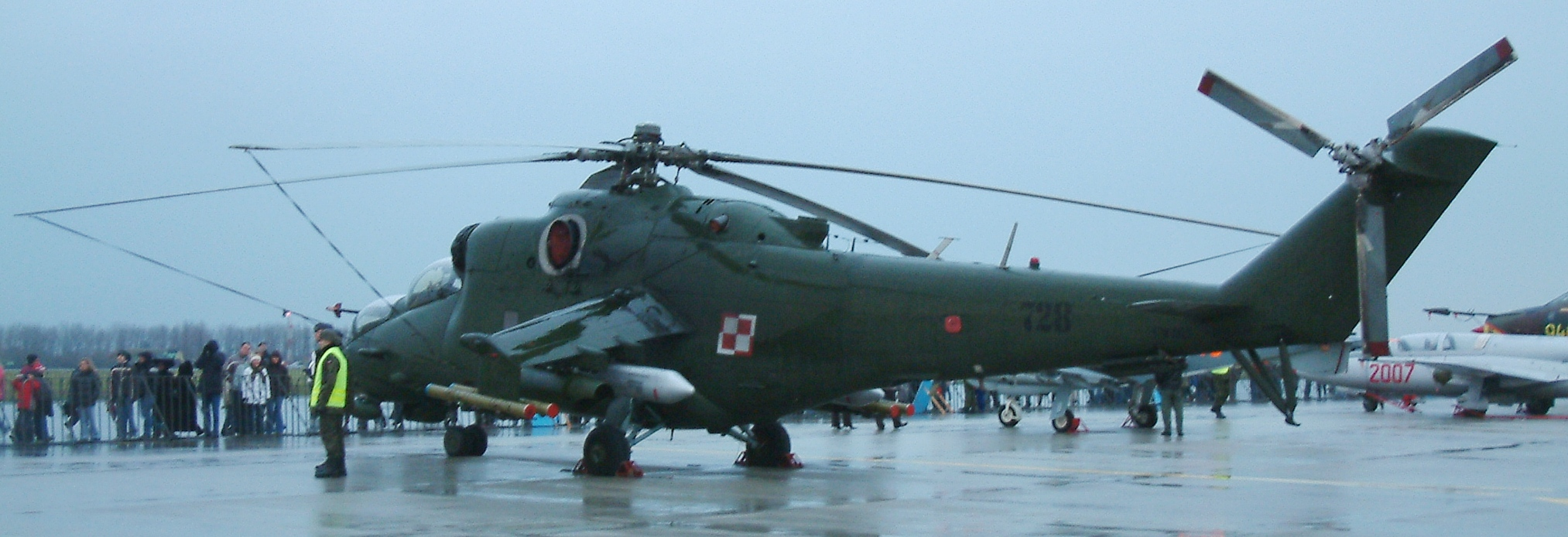
An MI-24 as seen from the side

The two F-15s now initiated a visual identification (VID) pass of the contact. The VID pass entailed violating one of OPC's rules of engagement, which prohibited fighter aircraft from operating below 10,000 feet (3,050 m) above the ground. At this time, the two Black Hawks had entered a deep valley and were cruising at a speed of 130 knots (150 mph; 240 km/h) about 200 feet (60 m) above the ground. Wickson's VID pass was conducted at a speed of about 450 knots (520 mph; 830 km/h), 500 feet (150 m) above and 1,000 feet (300 m) to the left of the helicopters. At 10:28, Wickson reported "Tally two Hinds" and then passed the two Black Hawks. "Hind" is the NATO designation for the Mil Mi-24 helicopter, a helicopter that the Iraqi and Syrian militaries operated and was usually configured with armament on small, side-mounted wings. Wilson responded with, "Copy, Hinds", and asked Wang, "Sir, are you listening to this?" Wang responded, "Affirmative", but offered no further guidance or comments.

May then conducted his own VID pass about 1,500 feet (500 m) above the helicopters and reported, "Tally 2." May later stated to a USAF accident investigation board that his "Tally 2" call meant that he saw two helicopters but did not mean that he was confirming Wickson's identification of them as Hinds. Neither F-15 pilot had been informed that U.S. Army Black Hawks participating in OPC often carried auxiliary fuel tanks mounted on wings nor had either been instructed in the paint scheme that Iraqi Hind helicopters used, light brown and desert tan, which was different from the dark green color used by the Black Hawks. Wickson later said, "I had no doubt when I looked at him that he was a Hind ... The Black Hawk did not even cross my mind."

Following their VID passes, Wickson and May circled back behind the helicopters approximately 10 miles (16 km). Because aircraft from various nations sometimes operated unannounced in the northern Iraq area, the OPC rules of engagement required the F-15 pilots to attempt to verify the nationality of the helicopters. Instead, at 10:28, Wickson notified the AWACS that he and May were "engaged" and instructed May to "arm hot." At 10:30, Wickson fired an AIM-120 AMRAAM missile at the trail helicopter from a range of about 4 nautical miles (10 km). The missile hit and destroyed the trailing helicopter seven seconds later (36°46′N 44°05′E). In response, the lead Black Hawk, piloted by McKenna, immediately turned left and dived for lower altitude in an apparent attempt to evade the unexpected attack. About 20 seconds later, May fired an AIM-9 Sidewinder missile at the lead helicopter from a range of about 1.5 nautical miles (2.8 km), hitting and shooting it down also about 1.2 miles (2 km) northeast of the trail helicopter (36°55′N 43°30′E). All 26 people on board the two Black Hawks were killed. After flying over the wreckage of the two helicopters lying burning on the ground, May radioed Wickson, "Stick a fork in them, they're done."

== Air Force accident investigation ==
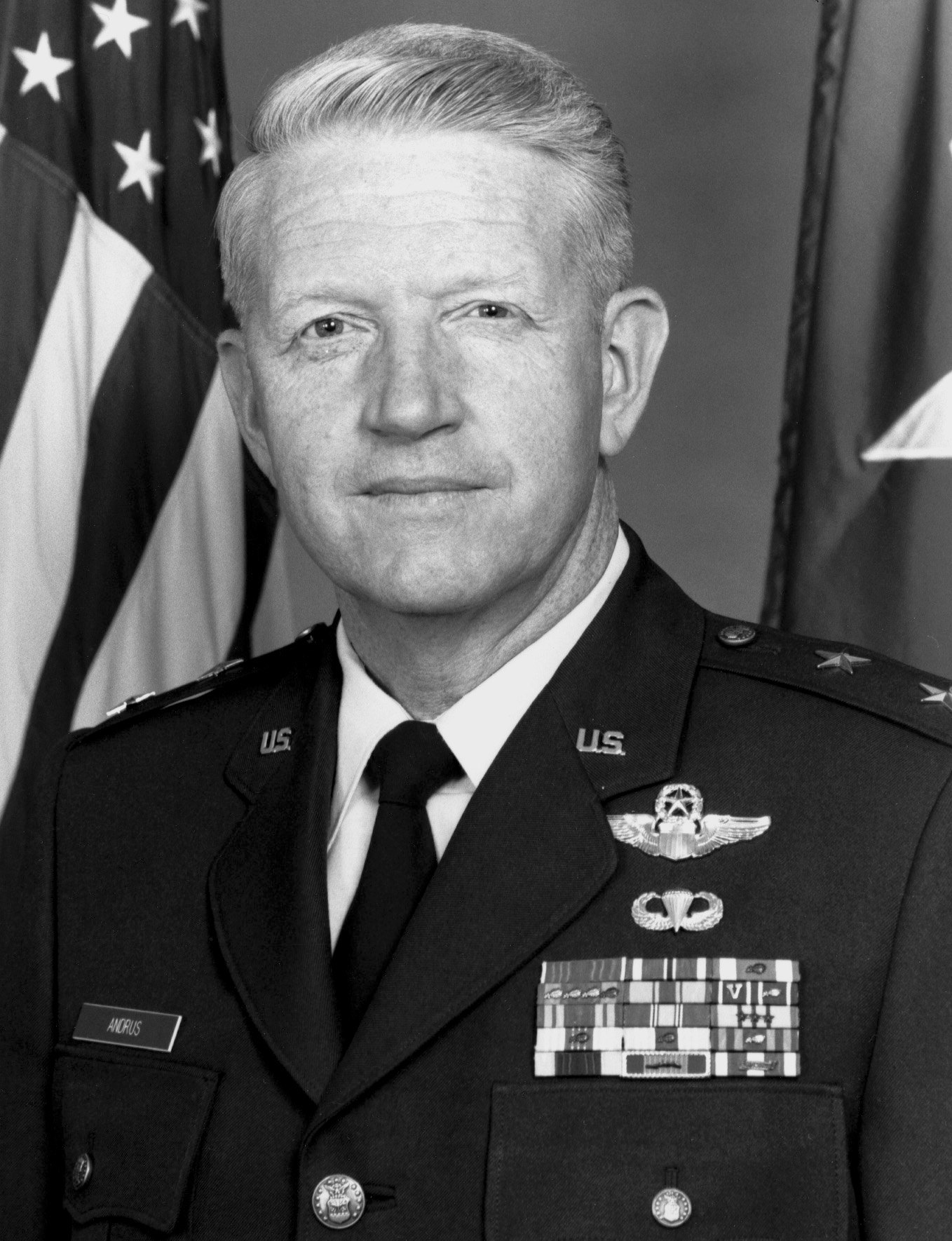
USAF Major General James G. Andrus

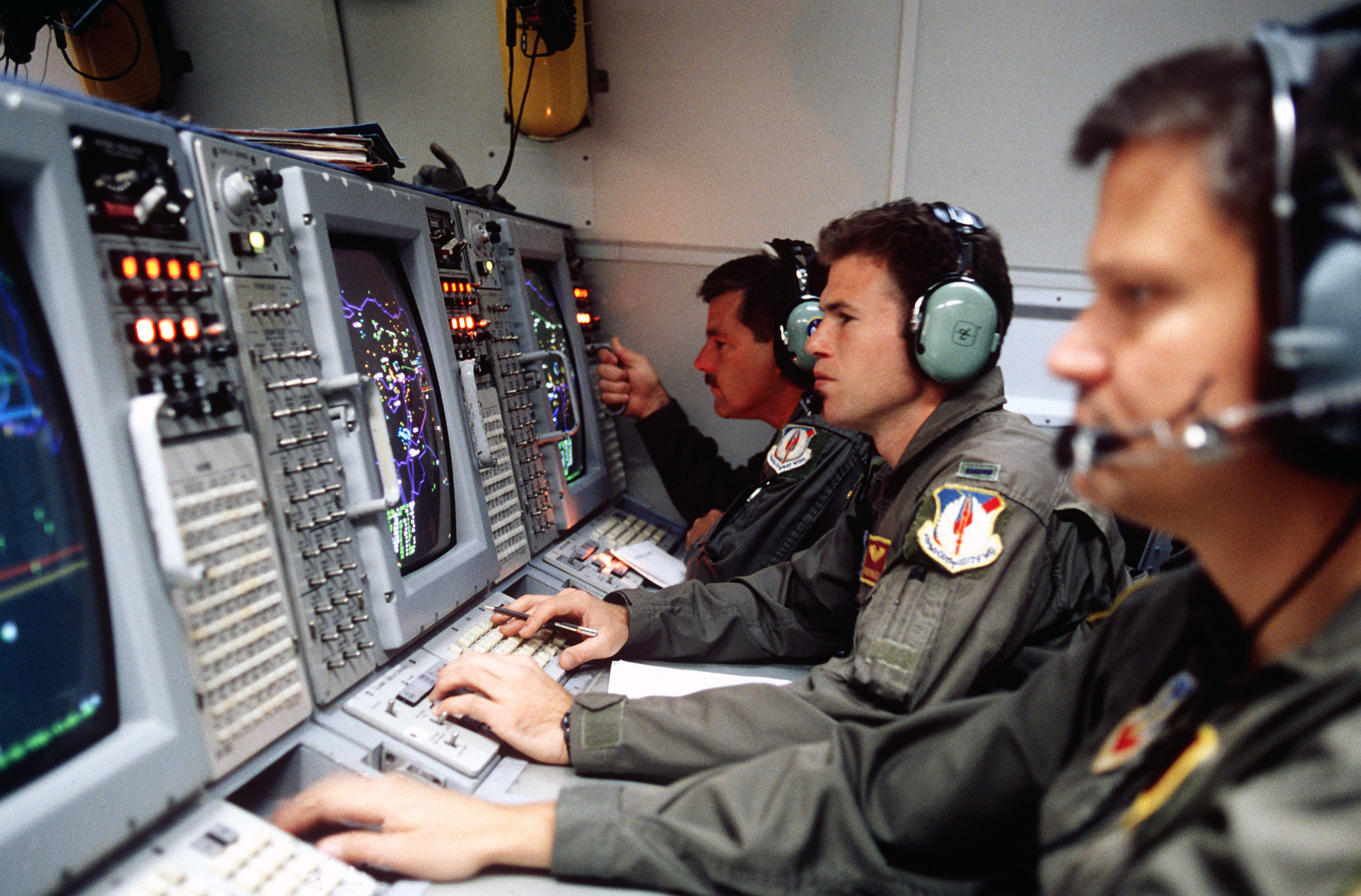
AWACS crew members at their stations aboard their aircraft during an OPC mission

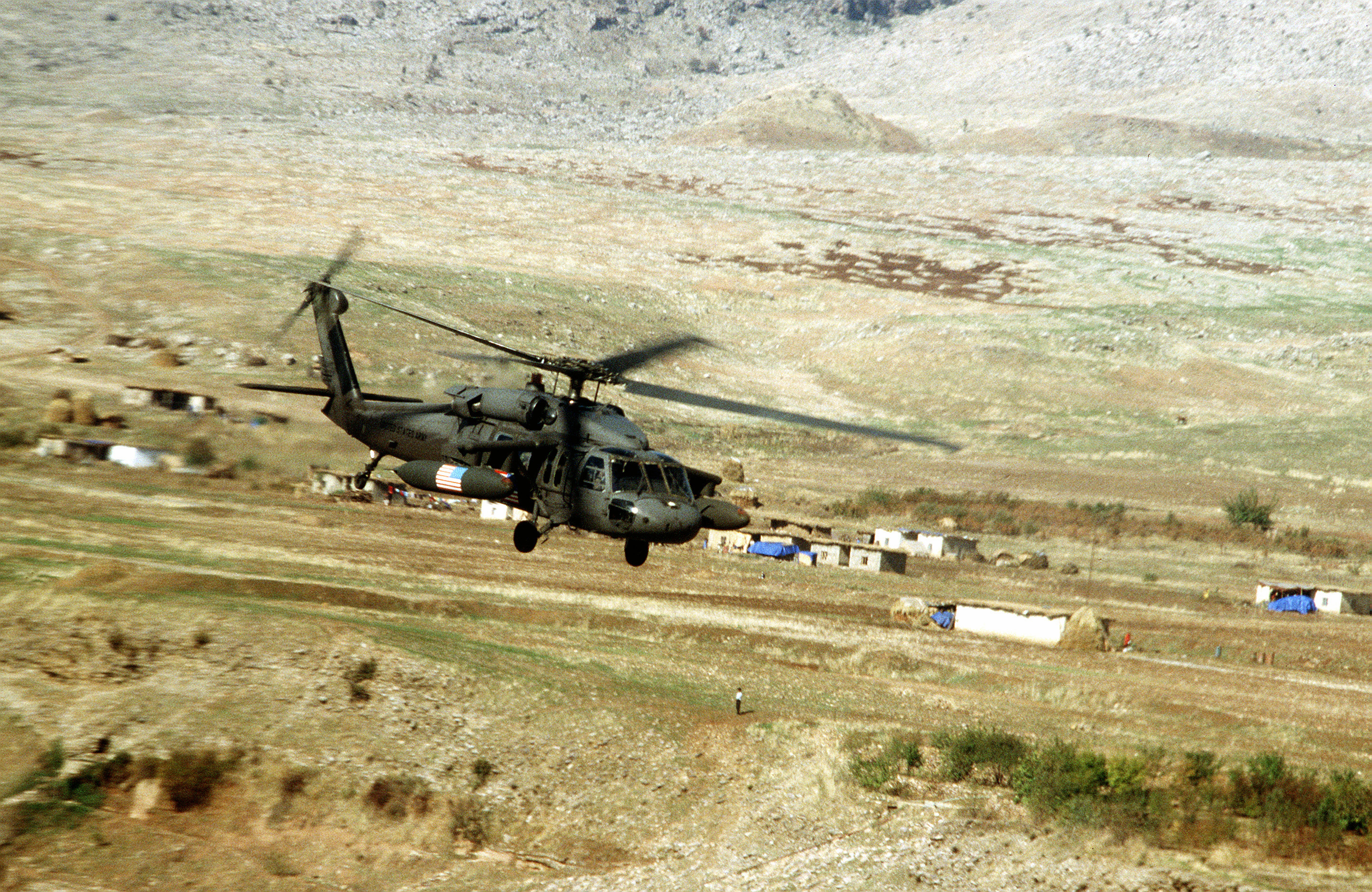
A U.S. Army Black Hawk flies over a small village in the Kurdish occupied security zone in Northern Iraq during OPC

By 13:15 local time, Kurdish civilians notified the MCC they had witnessed the two Black Hawks being shot down 40 miles (64 km) north of Arbil and that there were no survivors. The news was quickly picked up by the media and broadcast by CNN.

Within hours, U.S. President Bill Clinton was briefed on the shootdown and called the heads of government of the United Kingdom and France, John Major and François Mitterrand, to express regret and sympathy for the deaths of their citizens in the incident. Clinton appeared a few hours later in a televised news conference in which he said he had directed the U.S. Department of Defense (DoD) to lead an inquiry into the accident. Clinton further stated, "We will get the facts, and we will make them available to the American people and to the people of Britain, France, and Turkey, our partners in Operation Provide Comfort."

General Robert C. Oaks, USAF, Commander of United States Air Forces in Europe, immediately appointed an Air Force Regulation (AFR) 110-14 accident investigation board composed of a board president, eleven board members from the USAF and U.S. Army, three associate members from France, Turkey, and the United Kingdom, four legal advisers, and thirteen technical advisers. The board president was Major General James G. Andrus, USAF. An AFR 110-14 investigation's findings are publicly released and the testimony of witnesses in the investigation can be used against them in military disciplinary proceedings. For this reason, after serious mishaps, the USAF usually also conducts a separate safety investigation, in which the results are not publicly released and witness testimony is immune from prosecution. In this case, however, for unknown reasons, the USAF decided not to conduct a safety investigation.

After interviewing 137 witnesses and conducting numerous tests, the 27-volume, 3,630-page AFR 110-14 investigation report was publicly released on 13 July 1994, although some report's details had been leaked to the media by unknown defense officials two weeks earlier. The board made seven general findings about what they believed caused the shootdown to occur:

1. Wickson misidentified the Black Hawk helicopters and May failed to notify Wickson that he had been unable to confirm the identity of the helicopters.
2. The IFF transponders on the F-15s and/or the Black Hawks did not operate correctly for unknown reasons.
3. Misunderstandings existed throughout the OPC forces as to how coalition air operations procedures and responsibilities applied to MCC helicopter operations.
4. The AWACS crew commander, Lawrence Tracy, was not currently qualified in accordance with USAF regulations, and he and the other AWACS crewmembers committed mistakes.
5. OPC personnel in general were not properly trained in the rules of engagement for the northern Iraq no-fly zone.
6. The Black Hawks were not equipped with more modern radios which would have allowed them to communicate with the F-15s.
7. The shootdown "was caused by a chain of events which began with the breakdown of clear guidance from the Provide Comfort Combined Task Force to its component organizations."

The board report stated that, "There is no indication that the AWACS Senior Director (Wang), the Mission Crew Commander (Tracy) and/or the DUKE (Martin) made any radio calls throughout the intercept, or that they issued any guidance to either the AWACS crew or the F-15 pilots." Although the OPC ROE did task the AWACS with controlling and monitoring helicopter operations in the TAOR, the board found that the AWACS crew believed they had no responsibility for controlling U.S. Army Black Hawks or ensuring that other coalition aircraft were aware of Black Hawks operating in the TAOR. When questioned by board investigators as to who was responsible for tracking the helicopters, Tracy said, "I cannot tell you that. I honestly don't know." When Wang was asked the same question by the investigators, he replied, "No one is responsible." When the investigators asked Martin what action he took when the F-15s called a visual identification on two Hind helicopters, Martin stated, "I did nothing."

The board found that combined OPC forces, led by Pilkington, Emery, Richardson, and other USAF officers, had failed to integrate helicopters into aircraft operations in the TAOR. An Eagle Flight officer later testified he had been told by the CTF's chief of staff, a USAF officer, that the Army Black Hawk unit was not considered to be part of OPC. Thus, the CTF staff, under the direction of Colonel James Rusty O'Brien, USAF, had not tried to coordinate the U.S. Army Black Hawk missions into the daily ATOs. In fact, neither O'Brien nor his predecessors had established any type of procedure for communicating information on Black Hawk missions to the Combined Forces Air Component (CFAC). The MCC commander, Colonel Thompson, had personally called O'Brien on the night of 13 April to tell him about the next day's Black Hawk mission into northern Iraq, a mission specifically and personally approved by Pilkington earlier that day. O'Brien or his staff apparently did not attempt to communicate specific information on this mission to the AWACS or F-15 fighter units at Incirlik, the CFAC, the ground-based mission director, or to the "Duke" on board the AWACS.

For reasons that USAF officers were unable to explain, two versions of each day's ATO were published, one for the USAF units at Incirlik, and another for the Eagle Flight unit at Pirinclik. The ATO version sent to Eagle Flight, for unknown reasons, gave a wrong IFF Mode I code for the TAOR. Although Army Black Hawks had been operating for almost two years in the TAOR while squawking a wrong code and observed doing so by numerous AWACS crews, no one ever told them they were using a wrong code. On the day of the shootdown, the F-15s had interrogated the Black Hawks on two different IFF Modes (Mode I and Mode IV). The first responded negatively because the Black Hawks were squawking the wrong code. The second mode responded negatively for technical reasons that the investigation was unable to conclusively determine.

The board did not investigate whether any USAF institutional factors, such as a lack of crew resource management training for the involved aircrews, might have been a factor. Also, the board did not attempt to determine if Wickson and May had violated any of the existing OPC rules of engagement as defined by the ATO or other written instructions.

The United States Secretary of Defense, William Perry, later summarized the "errors, omissions, and failures" contributing to the accident as, "The F-15 pilots misidentified the Black Hawks, the AWACS crew failed to intervene, Eagle Flight and their operations were not integrated into the Task Force, and the IFF systems failed." General Shalikashvili, now serving as Chairman of the Joint Chiefs of Staff, added: "There were a shocking number of instances where people failed to do their job properly."

=== Actions taken ===
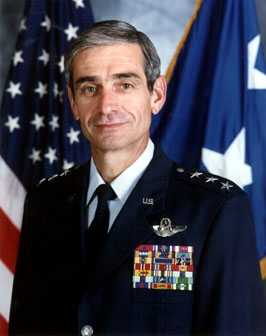
USAF Lieutenant General Eugene D. Santarelli

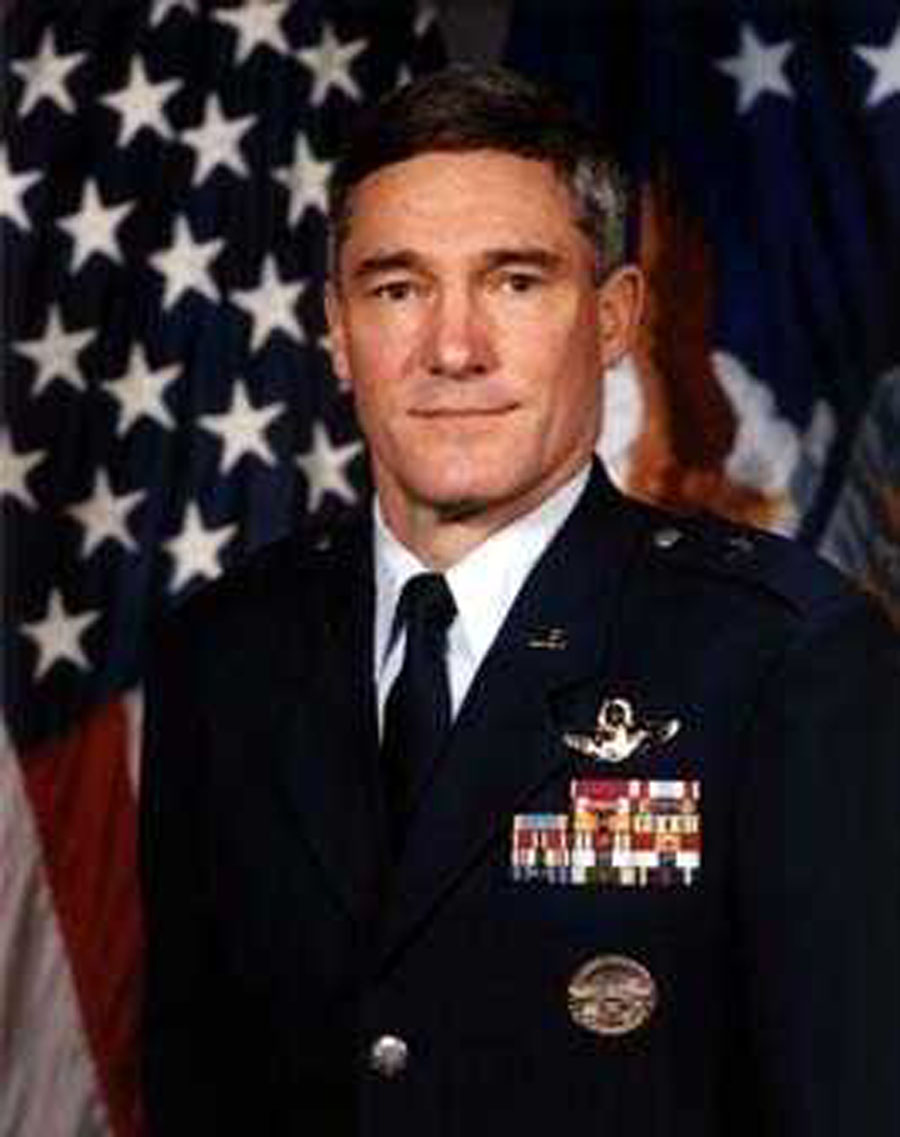
USAF Brigadier General Curtis H. Emery

On 8 September 1994, the DoD announced the actions it would take in response to the investigation's findings. May was charged with 26 counts of negligent homicide by military legal authorities. Martin, Tracy, Wang, Halcli, and Wilson were charged with dereliction of duty. All of those charged faced an Article 32 hearing in which it would be decided if they should be tried by court-martial or the matter disposed of otherwise. Martin, Tracy, Wang, Halcli, and Wilson faced a joint Article 32 hearing while May's hearing was separate. Wickson was not charged. Although not explicitly stated by USAF leaders, it appears Wickson was not charged but May was because Wickson had testified that he was sure of his identification of the two Black Hawks as hostile Hinds, while May had stated that he was not sure of Wickson's identification but had allowed the engagement to proceed anyway.

Martin and Halcli waived their right to an Article 32 hearing, meaning their cases could move immediately to court-martial or administrative action. Wickson was given immunity by USAF Lieutenant General Eugene Santarelli, commander of the 17th Air Force, to testify at the hearings. The AWACS crew members' hearing, which began on 19 October 1994 at Tinker Air Force Base, Oklahoma, was an open hearing and presided over by Colonel William Colwell, USAF, under the legal jurisdiction of Lieutenant General Stephen Croker, USAF, commander of the 8th Air Force. May's hearing, beginning on 7 November 1994 at Sembach Air Base, Germany, was a closed hearing and presided over by Colonel Edward M. Starr, USAF, under the legal jurisdiction of Santarelli. Pilkington, Emery, Richardson, and O'Brien declined requests to testify at either hearing.

On 17 November 1994, the USAF announced that Colwell had recommended to Croker that Wang face court-martial and that Halcli receive nonjudicial administrative action on the dereliction of duty charges. Colwell recommended the formal dereliction of duty charges be dropped against the other AWACS crew members, but that they could still face nonjudicial action. Croker accepted Colwell's recommendation and ordered Wang to face court-martial and dismissed the criminal charges against the other AWACS crew members except Halcli, who was offered Article 15 action.

At his hearing, May changed his testimony from what he gave to the accident investigation board, stating that he had positively identified the two helicopters as Iraqi Hinds. Brigadier General John R. Dallager, an F-15 pilot and Wickson's and May's wing commander (52nd Fighter Wing) and regimental court-martial 303 inquiry officer, said he found May's errors in the shootdown "reasonable." Starr recommended the charges against May be dropped, stating that he found May's testimony believable. On 27 December 1994, the USAF announced that Santarelli, an F-15 pilot, had dismissed the charges against May and had decided not to pursue criminal disciplinary actions against any other OPC personnel under his legal jurisdiction, including Wickson, Pilkington, Emery, Richardson, and O'Brien. In January 1995, a USAF flying board returned Wickson and May, who had been grounded since the incident, to flying status. Subsequently, Wickson was transferred to Randolph Air Force Base, Texas, to undergo instructor pilot training with a follow-on assignment to Columbus Air Force Base, Mississippi.

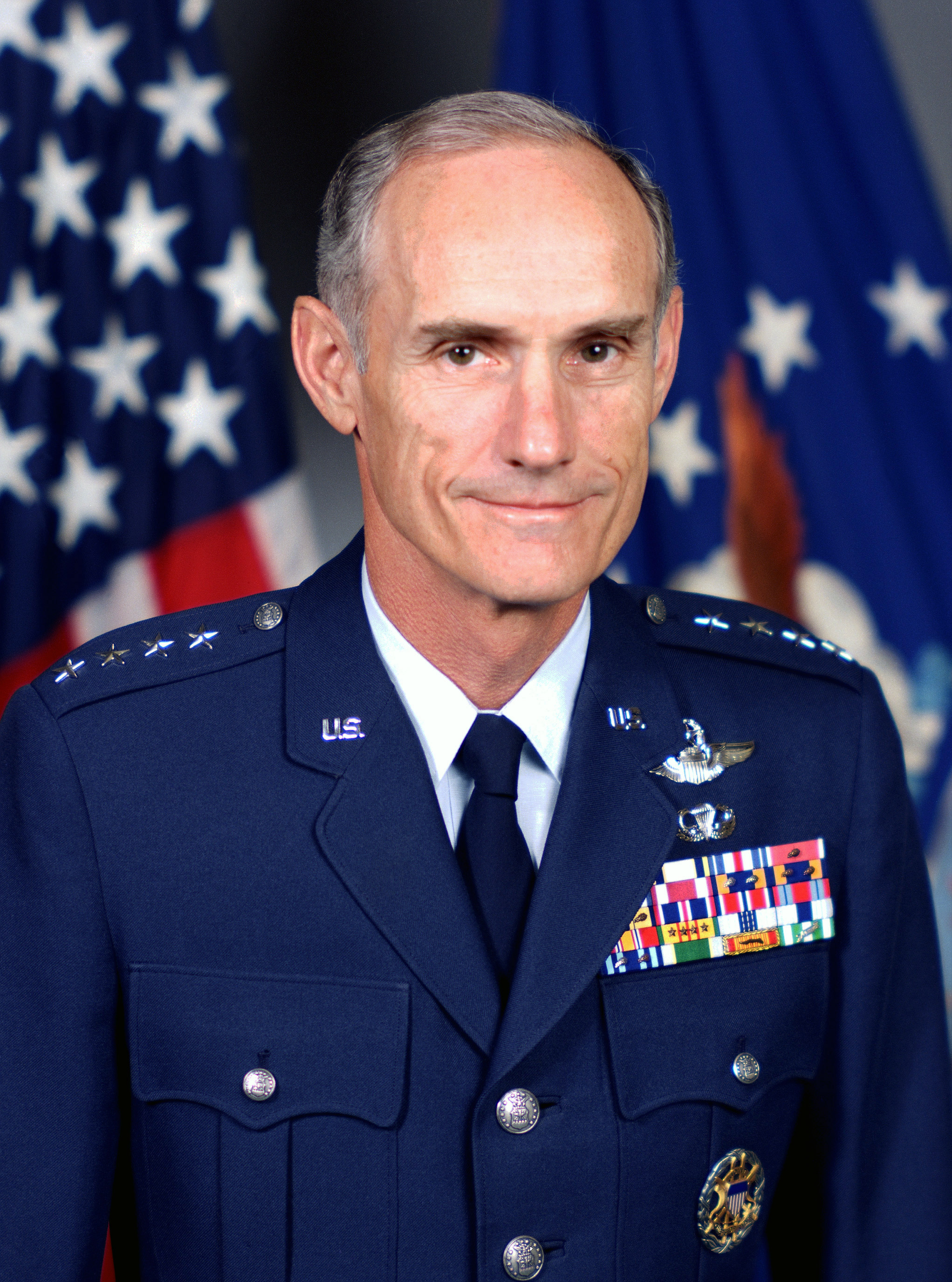
USAF General Merrill McPeak

The USAF later announced the administrative actions taken against the other personnel involved in the shootdown. Pilkington, Emery, and Richardson received letters of admonishment. Martin, May, O'Brien, Tracy, Wickson, and Wilson received letters of reprimand. Halcli accepted an Article 15 action which resulted in his receiving a letter of reprimand. The personnel involved were allowed to petition for the removal of the letters from their records at a future time. The reprimands were placed in "unfavorable information files" for each individual and were normally removed after two years. General George Joulwan, U.S. Army, Supreme Allied Commander, Europe, removed Pilkington as commander of OPC, but the USAF retained him as commander of the 86th Airlift Wing at Ramstein Air Base, Germany. O'Brien and Emery were transferred to staff positions at the Pentagon. Richardson was transferred to a staff position at Supreme Headquarters Allied Powers Europe. Emery had been promoted to brigadier general on 15 July 1994 and his promotion was allowed to stand.

=== Wang's court-martial ===
Wang's court-martial took place, beginning on 2 June 1995, at Tinker Air Force Base. Wang was tried on three counts of dereliction of duty. Most of the personnel involved in the incident, except May, were called to testify, including the AWACS crew members, Wickson, and Pilkington. Most of the 40 witnesses testified with a grant of immunity.

During the trial, evidence was presented that Wang often had trouble staying awake during AWACS missions. In fact, the problem was considered serious enough that the military had referred Wang to medical authorities to be checked for narcolepsy. Wang had also previously failed two check rides.

Pilkington, an F-16 pilot, testified that as commander of OPC he had sent numerous aircrew members, the majority of them F-15 pilots, back to their home bases for violating OPC rules or procedures or for displaying a lack of good judgment. In response to questions on the F-15 pilot's actions resulting in the shootdown, Pilkington stated, "I don't understand and I will probably never understand Wickson's mindset." When asked if Wickson and May violated OPC rules of engagement in the incident, Pilkington responded, "Yes." AWACS crew members added in their testimonies that once Wickson and May visually identified the helicopters as hostile, all responsibility for the shootdown passed to the F-15 pilots.

Frank Spinner, Wang's civilian attorney, argued that USAF Chief of Staff General Merrill McPeak, a career fighter pilot, had made clear that he did not want Wickson and May punished for their actions in the shootdown. Cited as evidence for this was a Los Angeles Times report, published also in the European Stars and Stripes newspaper on 18 June 1994 that said McPeak "strongly opposed" court-martial action for Wickson or May. Pilkington stated that he had heard rumors McPeak had said something to that effect but could not confirm if they were true or not.

On 20 June 1995, the USAF announced a "nullification" verdict by Wang's 10-member court-martial jury, effectively acquitting Wang of the charges. Nullification is not a finding of innocence, but it is instead a refusal to convict on the stated charges. After the verdict, Wang stated, "I want to say the fight is nowhere near over for me. I want a congressional hearing or investigation into why I was the only person charged." Major General Nolan Sklute, the USAF's top legal officer, stated, "An incident like this does not necessarily mean that the conduct of all those involved rises to the level of criminal culpability. I'm satisfied with the handling of the case." Secretary of the Air Force Sheila Widnall added, "The Black Hawk helicopters were downed as a result of a tragic series of errors and unfortunate events involving numerous people. The mishap was not the result of any one individual's actions; the conduct of numerous officers and the system itself contributed."

== Additional investigations and actions ==
On 17 July 1995, U.S. Senator William Roth, chairman of the Permanent Subcommittee on Investigations, authorized a Senate investigation into the incident, primarily in response to complaints from family members of the shootdown victims that it appeared the U.S. military was not holding anyone seriously accountable for the shootdown. Also in response to complaints about the DoD's response to the incident, the U.S. House of Representatives' Armed Services Subcommittee on Military Personnel scheduled a hearing on the incident for 3 August 1995 to examine the accident investigation and the judicial actions that followed. In addition, on 24 July, the DoD ordered the USAF to reexamine the disciplinary and administrative actions for the personnel involved in the shootdown and for the Joint Chiefs of Staff to review the corrective actions taken against those involved and determine whether further action was necessary. Widnall requested that the new USAF chief of staff, Ronald R. Fogleman, begin his own review of accountability for the incident.

The House Committee on National Security hearing on 3 August was presided over by Congressman Bob Dornan and lasted one day. At the hearing, Pilkington and Andrus explained how the USAF accident investigation was conducted and emphasized that Wickson and May violated the OPC rules of engagement by conducting a VID pass of the Black Hawks that was inadequate to determine the helicopter's national origin. Andrus stated, "Sir, as a pilot, I would have made another pass. You would never fire until you know what you are shooting at." Retired USAF colonel and pilot Jerry Cox expressed concern to the committee with the F-15 pilots for not taking responsibility for their actions.

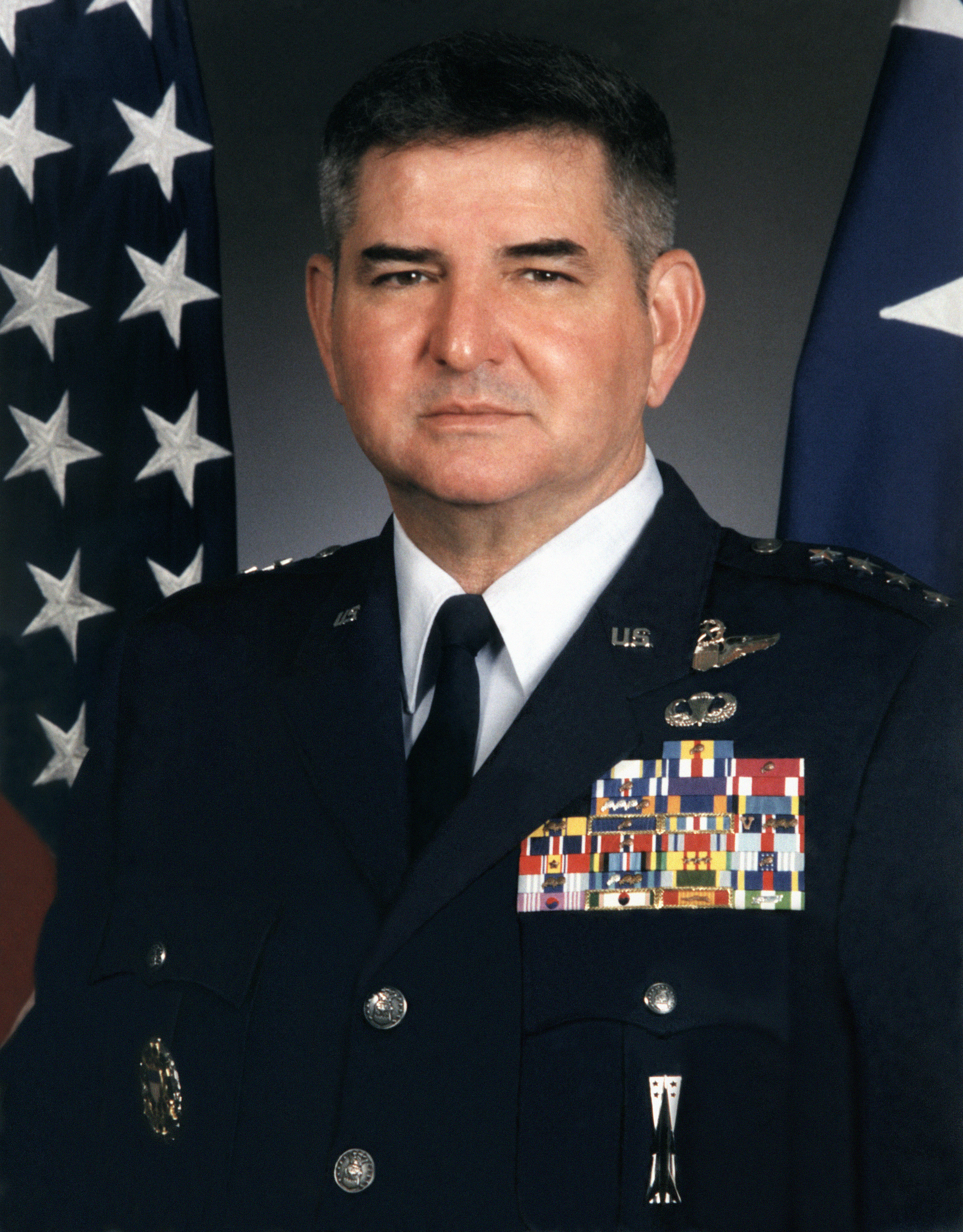
USAF General Ronald Fogleman

On 10 August 1995, Fogleman spoke at a press conference at the Pentagon in which he announced the conclusions reached by his review into the accountability of USAF personnel involved in the shootdown incident. He said his investigation found that not all the performance evaluations for the individuals involved in the shootdown reflected the fact that they had received administrative action related to the incident. Fogleman stated:

The fact that the conduct of some individuals did not give rise to criminal prosecution or conviction should not end the inquiry into the appropriateness of their actions. Air Force standards require that people display the extraordinary discipline, judgment, and training that their duties require and that the American people expect.

Fogleman then announced that he had directed that Wickson, May, Wang, Halcli, and Wilson be disqualified from aviation service duties for at least three years. Also, Fogleman wrote and placed "letters of evaluation" in the permanent personnel files of Wickson, May, Wang, Halcli, Wilson, Pilkington, and Emery that said each had failed "to meet Air Force standards in job knowledge, judgment and leadership". In addition, a military decoration awarded to O'Brien for his service during OPC was rescinded. A videotape in which Fogleman described his actions related to the incident and his views on standards and accountability was distributed throughout the USAF and all USAF officers, senior non-commissioned officers, and Senior Executive Service civilians were ordered to view it. Fogleman further stated that he had found that the military justice system had "worked as it was designed to work".

=== Senate investigation ===
Beginning in September 1995 and continuing for more than one year, Roth's Senate inquiry into the shootdown, led by Eric Thorson, investigated the incident. Thorson later stated his belief that the USAF accident investigation report and subsequent proceedings had been manipulated in order to avoid holding Wickson and May accountable for their actions. Thorson also stated that he believed Starr had submitted an inaccurate and misleading report on May's Article 32 hearing to the USAF commanding officers, including Dallager and Santarelli. With regard to the AWACS personnel, Thorson added: "We know some of the AWACS crew were incompetent beyond belief, and there is more than adequate evidence to conclude that several crewmembers were grossly negligent."

In August 1996, Roth's investigation board asked the DoD to produce the last four witnesses it wished to interview: Santarelli, Starr, Dallager, and Colonel C. G. Mangin. Mangin was Santarelli's legal adviser during the Wickson and May inquiry. The DoD refused the request to provide access to the four officers. A short time later, John White, U.S. Deputy Secretary of Defense, wrote a letter to Roth in which he asked that those four officers not be deposed.

After further refusals from the USAF and DoD to provide the four officers for interview, Roth's committee gave the DoD and USAF until 14:30 on 31 October 1996 to provide the officers. The deadline passed without the officers appearing before the board. The next day, the board sent Senate subpoenas directly to the USAF headquarters office at the Pentagon, which refused to accept them. After learning that the Senate was now planning to individually serve the four subpoenas directly to the four officers, the associate chief of the Air Force litigation division accepted the subpoenas.

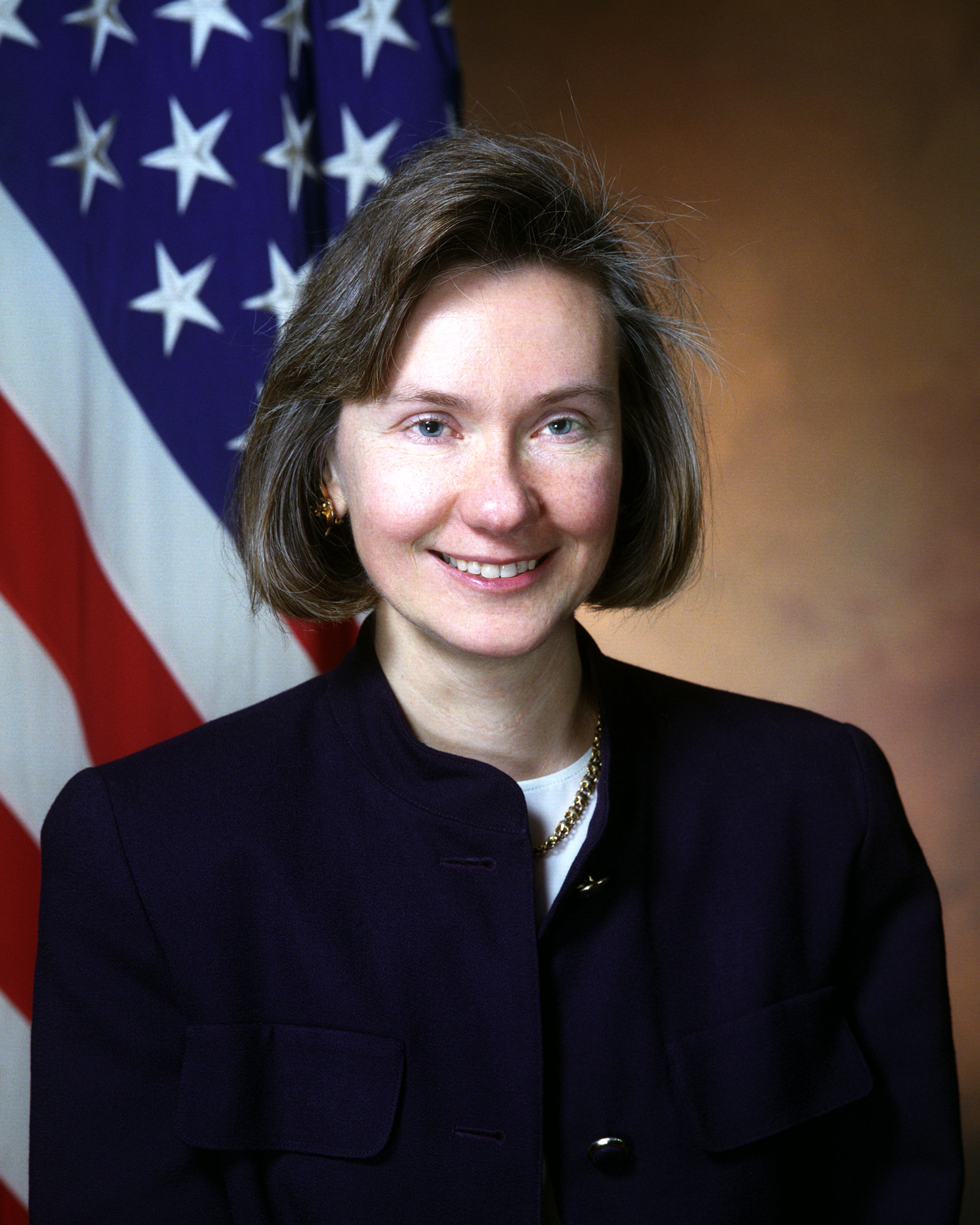
Judith Miller, U.S. DoD General Counsel

On 13 November 1996, the day the first subpoenaed USAF officer was scheduled to appear, the DoD delivered a letter to Roth, signed by its general counsel, Judith Miller, saying the DoD believed the subpoenas were invalid because they were issued "after the adjournment of sine die of the 104th Congress" and was therefore not going to honor the subpoenas by providing the four officers for interview. Roth replied to the DoD that only the Senate's legal counsel could determine the validity of congressional subpoenas because of the "separation of powers" principle in the U.S. Constitution and thus, the subpoenas were valid. The DoD, on 20 November in another letter signed by Miller, again refused to produce the witnesses. Roth, whose committee chairmanship was scheduled to end the next month, was told by the U.S. Department of Justice that the U.S. Attorney General, Janet Reno, would not support him if he chose to take the dispute with the DoD to court. Also, many of Roth's Senate colleagues, including John McCain, were asking him to "back off." Thus, Roth decided to drop the matter and continue preparing the report without the testimony of Santarelli, Dallager, Starr, and Mangin. For the first time in U.S. history, the DoD had refused to comply with a U.S. Senate subpoena.

In January 1997, U.S. Senator Fred Thompson became chairman of the Senate Permanent Subcommittee on Investigations and terminated the Black Hawk investigation. The Senate investigation report was never publicly released. Asked in 2001 about the DoD's refusal to honor the Senate subpoenas, Thorson responded, "Basically they told the United States Senate to go to hell."

=== GAO investigation ===
In September 1995, the House National Security Subcommittee on Military Personnel, chaired by Bob Dornan, requested that the Government Accountability Office (GAO) conduct its own investigation into the shootdown incident. Specifically, the GAO was asked to determine if the USAF accident investigation board had met its objectives, if the subsequent military justice investigations had followed established guidelines, and if the DoD and/or USAF had improperly or unlawfully influenced these investigations.

The GAO released its investigation report on 12 November 1997. The investigation determined that the USAF accident investigation was properly convened and met its assigned objectives. The GAO report, however, found that the USAF investigation had failed to note that Wickson and May neglected to report their contact with unidentified aircraft to the Duke (Martin) aboard the AWACS as required by the ROE. Furthermore, the USAF investigation report incorrectly stated that Martin had no authority to terminate the engagement when, in fact, he did. The GAO report added that the failure of Wickson and May to report their contact to Martin was indicative of a well-known, general lack of discipline among F-15 aircrews involved in OPC and this was not discussed in the USAF report.

The GAO investigation also uncovered evidence that a rivalry between F-15 and F-16 pilots may have contributed to Wickson's and May's "urgency to engage hostile aircraft" but was not discussed in the USAF investigation. During the GAO's investigation, USAF OPC officers confirmed that the rivalry between the F-15 and F-16 communities was particularly pronounced and intense partly due to the fact that F-16 aircraft had scored all the air-to-air combat kills in Iraq and Bosnia since the end of the Gulf War. Pilkington stated to the GAO that "the shootdown pilots' haste was due in part to the planned entry of two F-16s into the TAOR 10 to 15 minutes after the F-15s and that if the F-15 pilots had involved the chain of command, the pace would have slowed down, ruining the pilots' chances for a shootdown." The GAO concluded that if the evidence of a lack of mission discipline by Wickson and May had been included in the USAF report, such information "could have been useful in subsequent administrative and disciplinary actions."

Another aspect the GAO investigation revealed was that the training F-15 pilots received for identifying helicopters was not adequate. Visual ID training was accomplished by reviewing slides on a 35 mm projector. Helicopters made up only about 5% of the training slides and nearly all the pictures depicted helicopters from the ground looking up because the pictures were provided by the U.S. Army. Investigators also learned from interviewing other F-15 pilots that helicopter recognition was not regarded as an important skill within the F-15 pilot community because helicopters are not considered a threat to F-15s in air-to-air combat.

The GAO found no evidence of improper or unlawful command influence by USAF leaders on the investigation or subsequent administrative and military justice actions. The GAO noted, however, that it was unable to obtain complete confirmation of this finding because the DoD denied the GAO request to interview key USAF officials including Santarelli, Dallager, Starr, and Mangin.

== Compensation ==
On 26 August 1994, the U.S. Department of Defense announced that it would pay U.S.$100,000 (ex gratia) in compensation to the families of each of the non-U.S. personnel killed in the incident. At this time, the U.S. government did not offer compensation to the families of the U.S. victims, citing the Feres precedent, which prevents lawsuits against the U.S. from injured service members or families of personnel killed due to military negligence. This was the first time the U.S. had offered compensation to the victims of a friendly fire incident.

In 1998, Congressman Lamar S. Smith, chairman of the Subcommittee on Immigration and Claims, held hearings on the compensation issue. He questioned the DoD representatives as to why compensation had not also been offered to the U.S. family members. In November 1999, the U.S. Congress passed legislation authorizing payment of compensation to the families of the American Black Hawk victims.

== Aftermath ==
Black Hawk shootdown victims
1. Cornelius A. Bass, U.S. Army
2. Jeffrey C. Colbert, U.S. Army
3. Mark A. Ellner, U.S. Army
4. John W. Garrett Jr., U.S. Army
5. Michael A. Hall, U.S. Army
6. Patrick M. McKenna, U.S. Army
7. Erik S. Mounsey, U.S. Army
8. Michael S. Robinson, U.S. Army
9. Paul Barclay, U.S. Army
10. Benjamin T. Hodge, U.S. Army
11. Richard A. Mulhern, U.S. Army
12. Ricky L. Robinson, U.S. Army
13. Jerald L. Thompson, U.S. Army
14. Laura A. Piper, U.S. Air Force
15. Barbara L. Schell, U.S. State Dept
16. Harry Shapland, UK
17. Jonathan C. Swann, UK
18. Guy Demetz, France
19. Hikmet Alp, Turkey
20. Ceyhun Civas, Turkey
21. Barlas Gultepe, Turkey
22. Abdulsatur Arab, Kurdish
23. Ghandi Hussein, Kurdish
24. Nader Mekho, Assyrian
25. Salid Said, Kurdish
26. Ahmad Mohamad, Kurdish

Five days after the shootdown, USAF OPC officials began including Black Hawk flight times in the daily ATO and included the correct IFF code in the ATO provided to Eagle Flight. OPC officially ended on 31 December 1996. Over the six years of the operation, coalition participants flew a total of 62,000 fixed-wing and rotary-wing sorties. The Black Hawk shootdown was the only serious accident to occur during the operation.

Wickson resigned and May retired from the USAF soon after Fogleman's investigation was complete. Lawrence Tracy retired immediately after Wang's court-martial on an early (15-year) retirement option. By May 2005, Jim Wang was still serving in the USAF, but he remained at the rank of captain, having been denied promotion. Interviewed in 2005 about the shootdown, Tracy stated, "Jim (Wang) and all of us at first were held up as scapegoats. I think that was to cover up for the pilots. They had their fangs out. They wanted to kill something because it had been ages since an F-15 had shot anything down. We were held accountable for their actions."

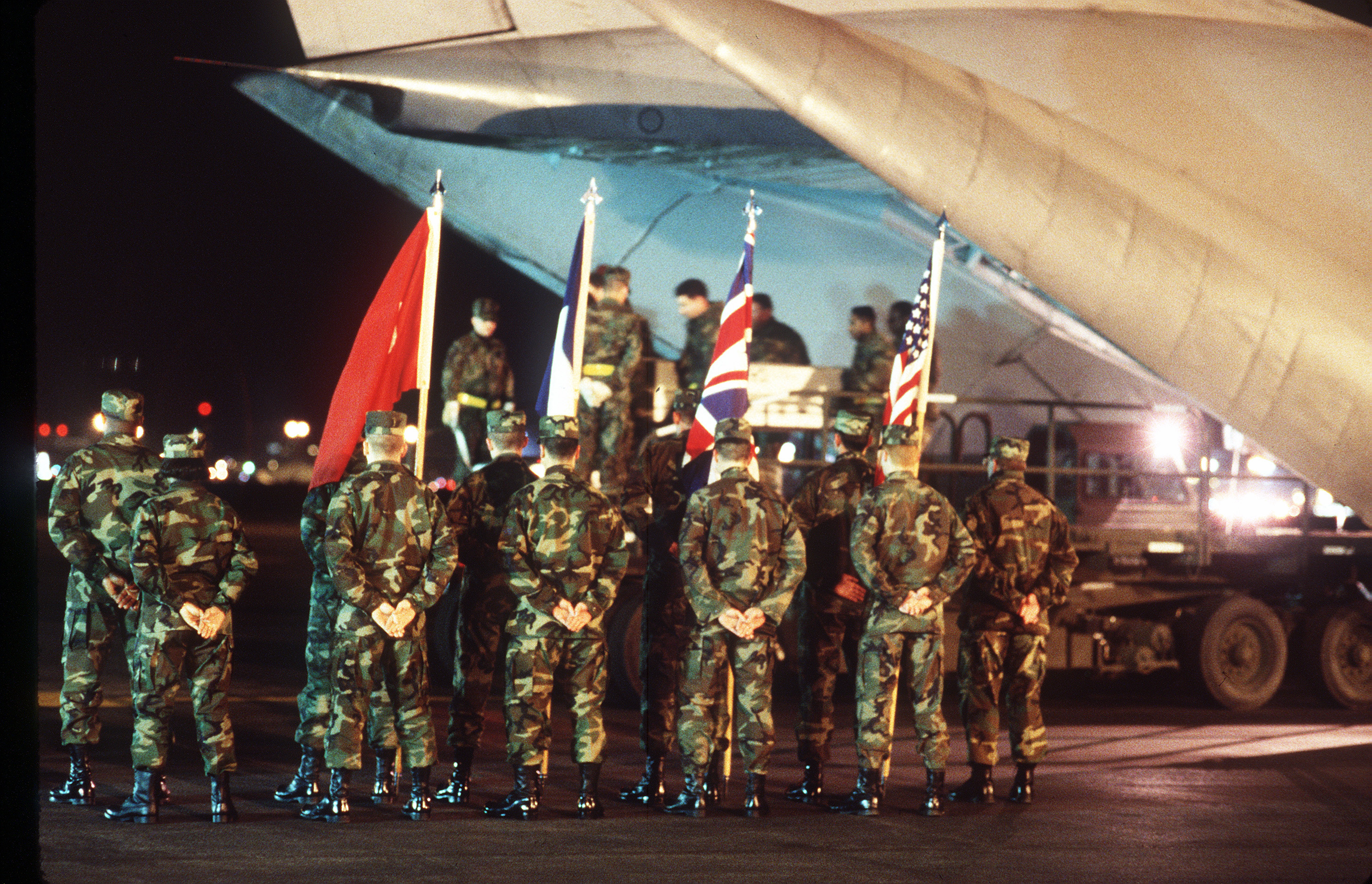
The remains of the 26 victims of the Black Hawk shootdown arrive at the U.S. Army Mortuary Center, Frankfurt Rhein-Main International Airport, Germany, on 15 April 1994

Andrus retired from the USAF in 1995, Pilkington in 1996, Emery in 1997, and Santarelli in 1998, all at the same rank they held at the time of the shootdown, except Emery, who retired as a brigadier general. Richardson was promoted to brigadier general on 1 July 1999 and retired on 1 September 2001. Dallager was appointed as superintendent of the USAF Academy in June 2000 and was promoted to lieutenant general on 1 August of the same year. Dallager's appointment and promotion were criticized by observers because of his involvement in the controversial shootdown after-actions and refusal to testify for the Senate investigation. Dallager retired on 1 September 2003 but at the rank of major general.

A monument to the 26 victims of the shootdown was constructed at Giebelstadt Army Airfield, Germany, and dedicated on 14 April 1996. After U.S. military presence ceased at Giebelstadt, due to base closures, the monument was moved to Fort Rucker, Alabama, on 10 March 2006, and rededicated on 14 April 2007.

The 53rd Fighter Squadron was closed on 10 March 1999 but was reactivated in December 2021 as part of 495th Fighter Group.
