= Chuck Wilson (pilot) =

US Air Force officer and pilot

Charles Wilson II
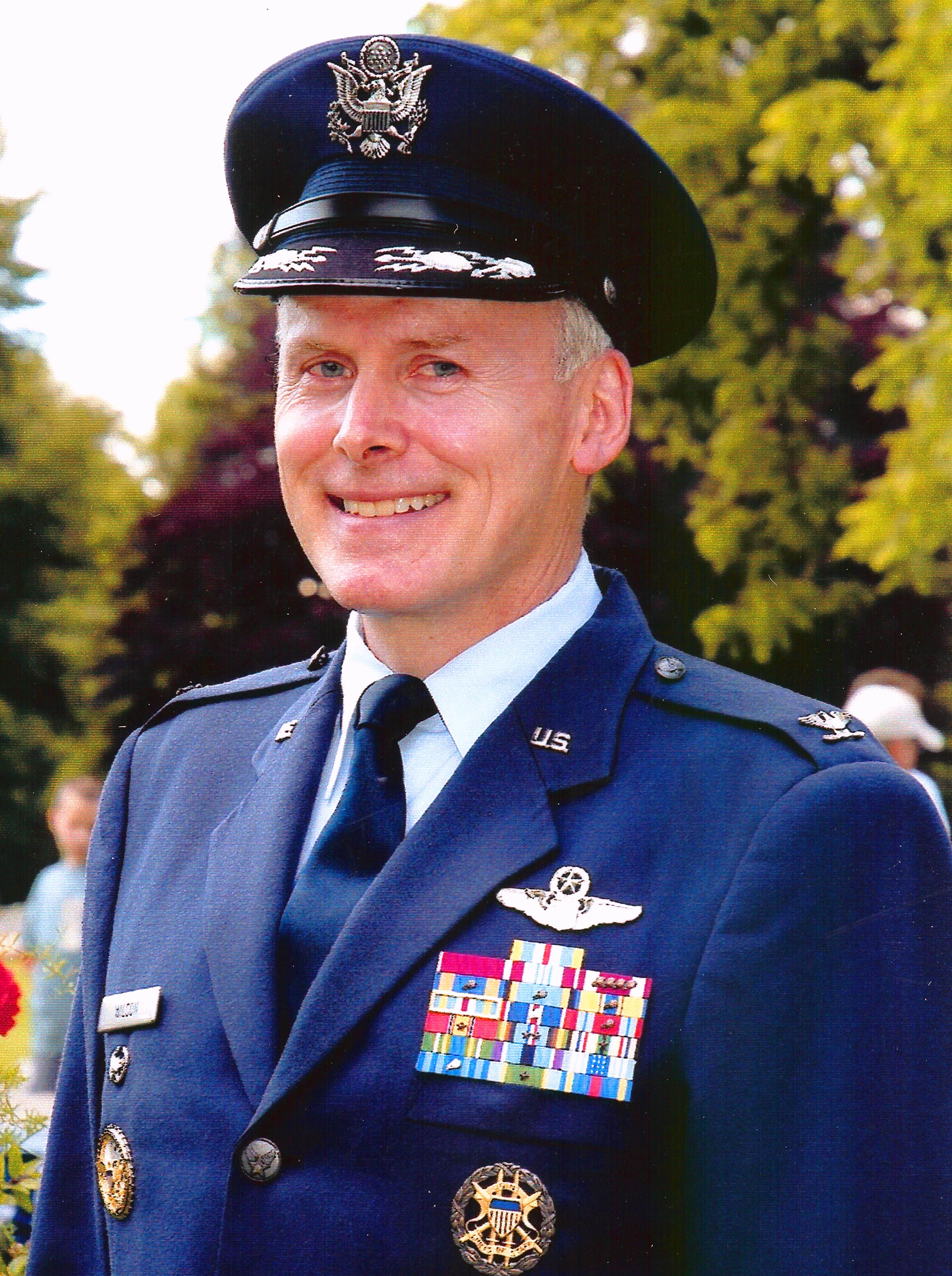
- Wilson at a Memorial Day ceremony in May 2005
- Born: November 22, 1953 (age 72); Indianapolis, Indiana
- Military career
- Allegiance: United States
- Branch: United States Air Force
- Service years: 1977–2004
- Rank: Colonel
- Nickname: Chuck
- Commands: Air Force Command and Control Training and Innovation Group; 5th Reconnaissance Squadron; 4402nd Reconnaissance Squadron; 6510th Air Base Group Headquarters Squadron
- Conflicts: Cold War; Gulf War
- Awards: Defense Superior Service Medal; Legion of Merit; Defense Meritorious Service Medal

Charles Paul Wilson II (born November 22, 1953) is a retired United States Air Force colonel who is notable for his work in political-military affairs, national security policy, defense acquisition, and business development. He commanded four different military units at the squadron and wing organizational levels. Wilson performed operational testing of the prototype S1034 pressure suit and flew the first operational mission of the Lockheed U-2S spy plane. He is a rated US Air Force command pilot with over 3,800 flight hours.

After retiring from the Air Force, Wilson worked as a business executive in the aerospace industry. He is a docent at the National Air and Space Museum, author, and a frequent military aviation speaker. Wilson is active in veterans' affairs and has made significant contributions including serving in leadership roles of increasing responsibility.

== Early life and education ==
Wilson was born November 22, 1953, in Indianapolis, Indiana and was the first of three children born to Charles Wilson Sr. and Mary Wilson. He grew up in Indianapolis where his father was a World War II combat veteran and an engineer for General Motors Corporation and his mother was a homemaker. Wilson went to Saint Michael's Grade School and graduated from North Central High School. Wilson also graduated from Culver Military Academy summer schools. He earned a Bachelor of Science Degree from Indiana University Bloomington. While at Indiana University, Wilson worked at United Parcel Service (UPS) at night unloading trucks, sorting packages, and was promoted into UPS management. Later, Wilson earned a Master of Science degree from Embry–Riddle Aeronautical University (1985), graduated from the United States Army Command and General Staff College, the Armed Forces Staff College (now the Joint Forces Staff College), the Air War College, and was the 1997 National Defense Fellow and author of Strategic & Tactical Air Reconnaissance in the Near East.

== Military career ==
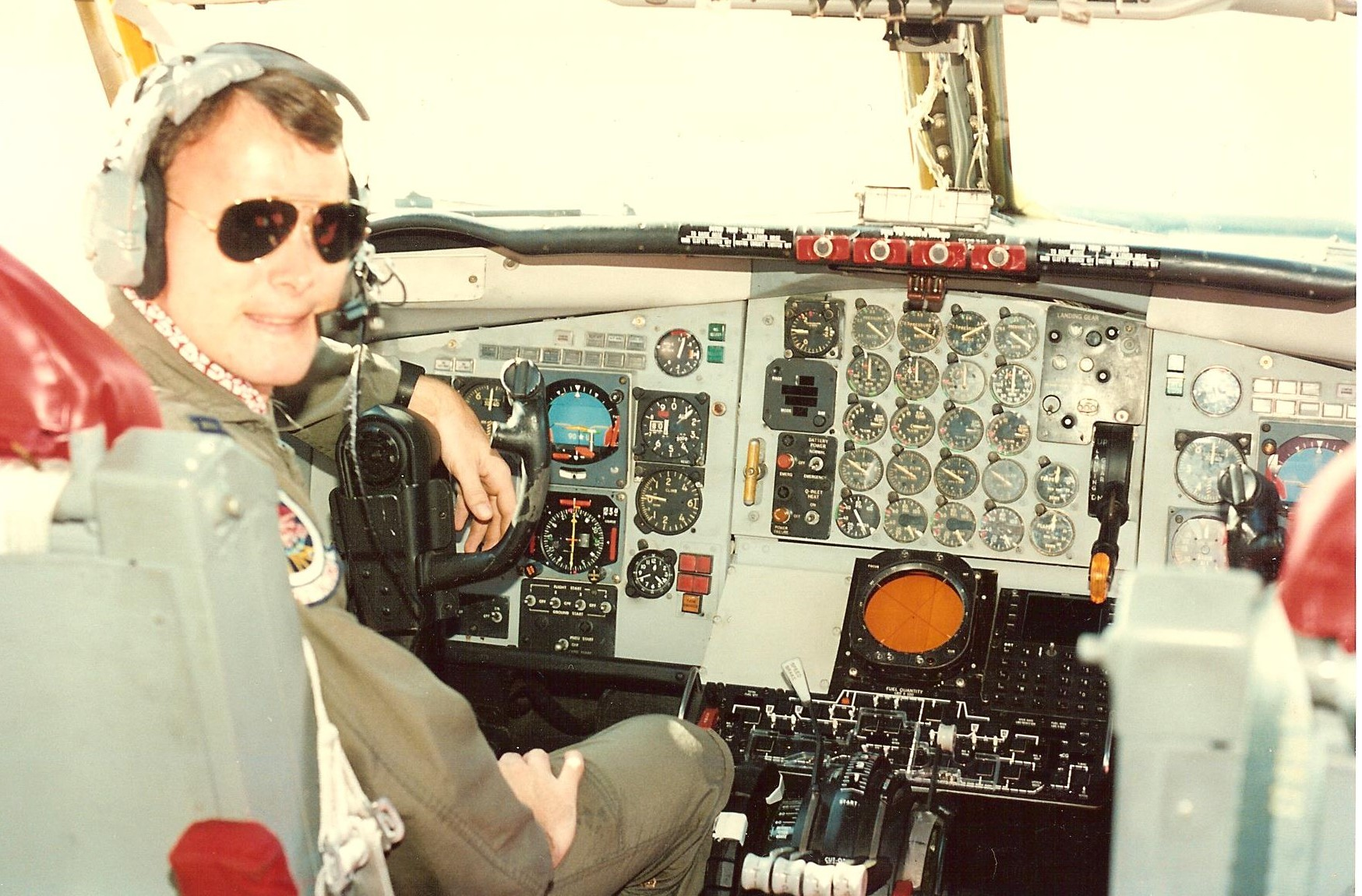
Wilson at the controls of a KC‑135Q Stratotanker

During his freshman year at Indiana University, Wilson, entered the Air Force Reserve Officer Training Corps (AFROTC) as a pilot candidate and completed the Air Force flight instruction program with a private pilot license. With the drawdown of US forces in Vietnam, Air Force pilot production was minimized with AFROTC pilot candidate slots for active duty virtually eliminated. Instead, Wilson was commissioned a second lieutenant, and in 1977, received orders to Port Austin Air Force Station in Michigan where he was posted as the chief of administration and personnel.

In 1980, Wilson was selected as commander of the 6510th Air Base Group (ABG) Headquarters Squadron, responsible for base services including personnel, public affairs, and security, where he achieved the Air Force Flight Test Center's "Executive Officer of the Year" award. Wilson was subsequently selected for Undergraduate Pilot Training (UPT) at Reese Air Force Base, Texas. After completing UPT, Wilson was assigned to fly the KC-135Q Stratotanker that refueled the SR-71 Blackbird. The Q-model KC-135 aircraft was specially configured to dispense the JP-7 fuel required by the SR-71.

=== U-2 Dragon Lady ===
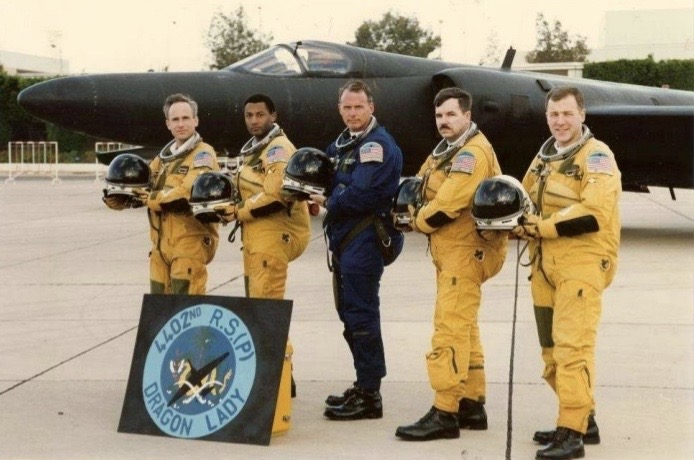
Wilson in blue prototype S1034 suit with other pilots of the 4402nd RS at Taif Air Base in 1994

In 1986, Wilson was selected to fly the Lockheed U-2 Dragon Lady, a high altitude reconnaissance aircraft. During the Cold War, he served on multiple operational deployments flying missions over contested areas of the world. Wilson advanced to flight instructor in the U-2 and in 1993 commanded the 4402nd Reconnaissance Squadron (Provisional), known as the Desert Dragons, at Taif Air Base, Saudi Arabia. A provisional squadron is one created for a limited time to accomplish a specific mission. The 4402nd was formed to continue reconnaissance operations over Iraq after the end of the 1991 Gulf War in order to ensure compliance with United Nations (UN) resolutions. U-2s from the 4402nd flew Olive Branch missions to provide imagery for the United Nations Special Commission (UNSCOM) that searched for evidence of Iraqi weapons of mass destruction. The Iraqi government did not approve of these overflights, and Wilson's first U-2 mission for the UN was targeted by Iraqi anti-aircraft weapons. The U-2s operating in-theater at this time had outdated defensive capabilities. Wilson's mission report was instrumental in obtaining funding for the "Band Aid" upgrades to the U-2's defensive systems. The U-2 flies at altitudes where the air pressure is too low for an unprotected person to survive. During his tour with the 4402nd, Wilson performed operational testing of the prototype S1034 pressure suit manufactured by the David Clark Company to evaluate its suitability in the U-2.

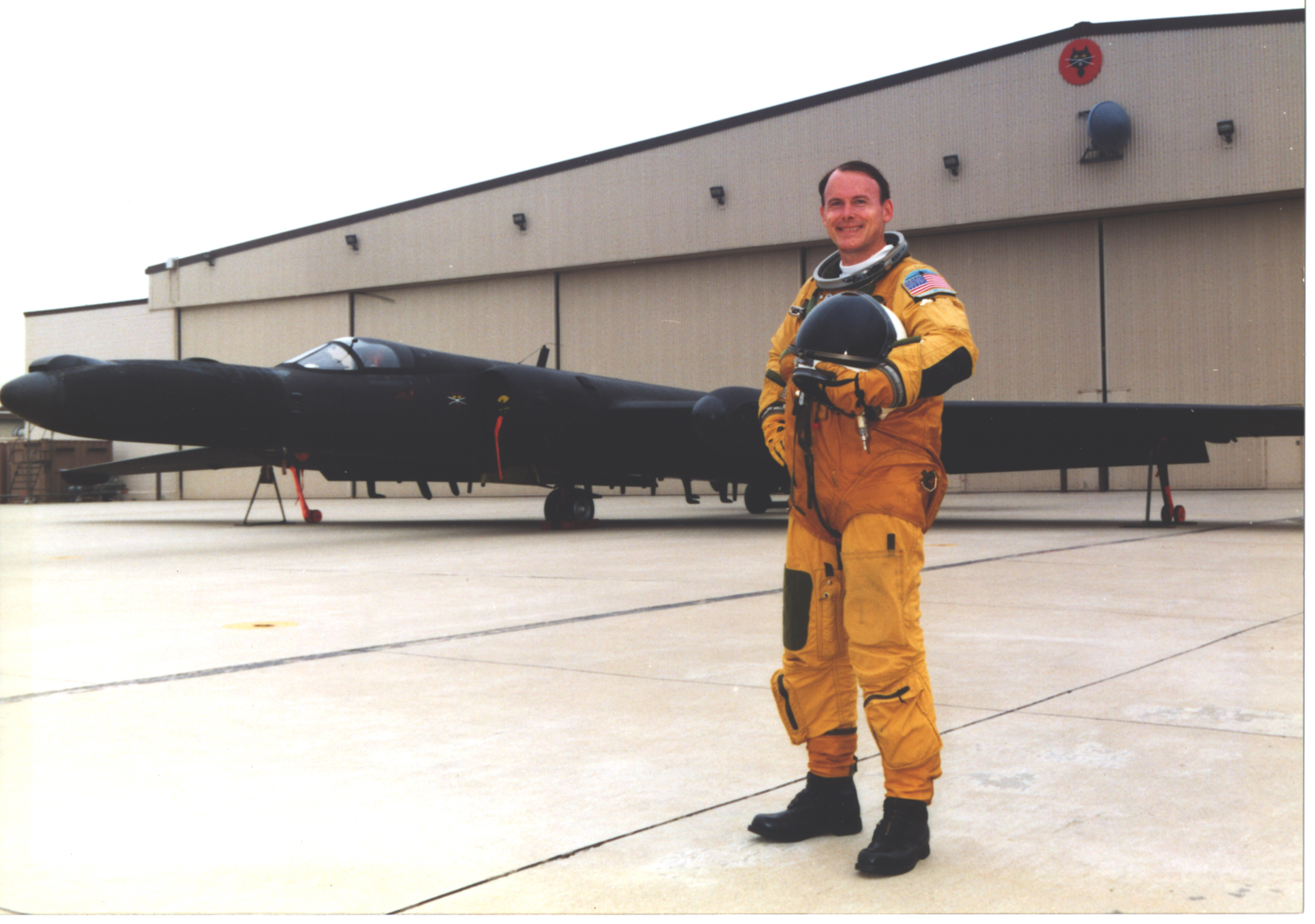
5th RS Commander Wilson with Lockheed U-2 at Osan Air Base, South Korea in 1995

In 1995, Wilson was assigned command of the 5th Reconnaissance Squadron, known as the Blackcats, that operated from Osan Air Base, South Korea. The squadron received the U-2S with an upgraded General Electric F118-101 engine that provided significant weight and fuel savings over the previous Pratt & Whitney J75 engine. On October 20, 1995, Wilson flew the first U-2S operational mission. Under Wilson's leadership, the 5th Reconnaissance Squadron received the 1995 Lockheed Advanced Development Corporation (Skunkworks) "Hughes Trophy," distinguishing the unit as the best reconnaissance squadron in the 9th Reconnaissance Wing that year. The 5th RS was also nominated for the Republic of Korea Presidential Unit Citation.

Promoted to colonel in 1997, Wilson was assigned as the commander of the Air Force Command and Control Training and Innovation Center (AFC2TIC) at Hurlburt Field, Florida. The center of excellence was renamed as the Air Force Command and Control Training and Innovation Group (AFC2TIG) in April 1999 and renamed again in 2004 as the 505th Command and Control Wing. Wilson's organization re-engineered airpower command and control (C^{2}) at the operational level of war. Air Operations Centers worldwide were restructured with trained staff, standardized equipment, and worked with a deliberate process that is used across the globe. The team trained warfighters of different experience levels. On short notice and at the direction of the chief of staff, AFC2TIG trained every active duty Air Force general officer on the Theater Battle Management Core System. Wilson led and managed this group of over 3,000 personnel and 13 disparate Air Force units located across the United States.

=== Pentagon assignments ===
In 1993, Wilson served on the Joint Staff of the Joint Chiefs of Staff (JCS) at the Pentagon in Arlington, Virginia. During this time, review and approval for peacetime reconnaissance operations was performed using the JCS "book process" and coordinated by the Reconnaissance Operations Division (ROD) within the J3 Operations Directorate. As Chief of Air Reconnaissance Plans and Programs, also known as the "book officer", Wilson was the principle focal point for acquiring National Command Authority and National Security Council approval for sensitive reconnaissance missions worldwide. In this position, he was also the advisor to the United Nations for Airborne Reconnaissance.

In 1997, Wilson was selected for the Office of the Secretary of Defense as the Chief of Manned Reconnaissance in the Defense Airborne Reconnaissance Office (DARO), and in 1998, Deputy Director for Airborne Intelligence Surveillance and Reconnaissance Programs in the Office of the Assistant Secretary of Defense (Command, Control, Communications and Intelligence), or ASD(C^{3}I), to oversee defense acquisition of air reconnaissance systems. ASD(C^{3}I) was replaced by the Assistant Secretary of Defense for Networks and Information Integration, or ASD(NII) in May 2003.

=== Department of State ===
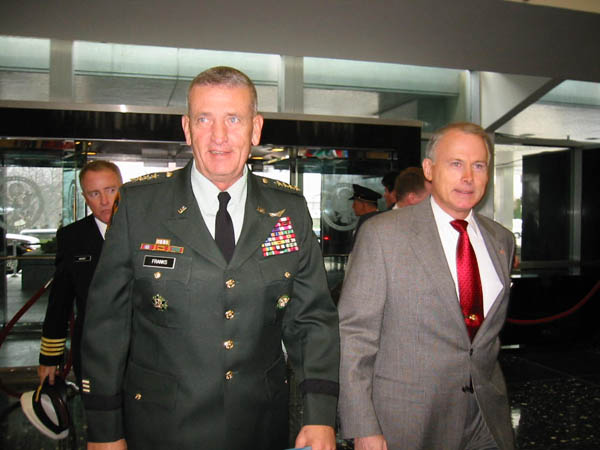
ISO Director Wilson (right) escorting USCENTCOM Commander General Tommy Franks to the European Chiefs of Mission Conference in 2003

In 2001, Wilson transitioned to military roles that interacted with the Department of State. Assigned as the deputy director of the Office of Contingency Planning and Peacekeeping within the Bureau of Political-Military Affairs, he was the senior Air Force advisor at the State Department. Shortly after the September 11 attacks, Wilson was promoted to director of the Office of International Security Operations (ISO) that provided the Department of Defense's primary interface with the Department of State on operational military situations. As ISO director, he was the senior US military representative to the Department of State. To support the around-the-clock war-time tempo, Wilson designed and implemented Political Military Action Teams (PMATs) that became the State Department's point of contact for military operations on the "war on terrorism."

Wilson oversaw ISO activities that included obtaining clearances for US cargo aircraft to enter the airspace of other countries, refueling at foreign airports, coordinating diplomatic efforts to establish bases in the countries bordering Afghanistan, and eventually supporting US embassies efforts to base US forces in coalition nations.

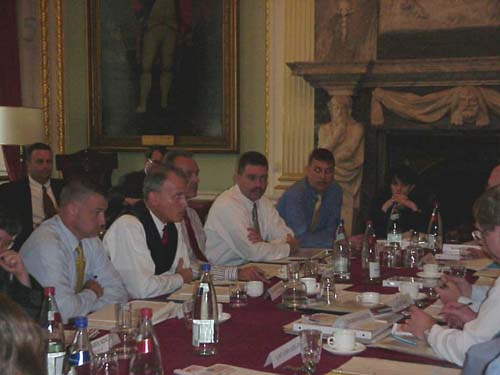
Wilson (in vest) leading the US delegation in the India Office Council Chamber within the UK Foreign Office

In 2002, Wilson led the US delegation in the annual United States/United Kingdom Political-Military talks to discuss access to the British-owned island of Diego Garcia. Wilson and British Indian Ocean Territory commissioner, Alan Huckle, reached agreement to add shelters for the B-2 Spirit bomber as well as upgrade existing infrastructure. B-2 facilities on Diego Garcia would allow the bombers to be based much closer to potential targets in the Asia-Pacific region reducing round-trip flight time from their Missouri bases from 50 hours to approximately 15. Two of the B-2 shelters were completed at Naval Support Facility Diego Garcia by the end of 2002 and two additional shelters were added in 2005.

One of Wilson's priorities as ISO director was providing information to Defense and State leadership. This task required he and his staff support visits to the State Department by senior military officers. These efforts were helpful and appreciated as demonstrated when USCENTCOM commander, General Franks, visited to personally meet and thank members of the ISO coalition team.

With 27 years of service, Wilson retired from the Air Force in December 2004 with over 3,800 flying hours in the T-37, T-38, KC-135A, KC-135Q, TR-1, and U-2.

== Later years ==
After retirement, Wilson worked in the aerospace industry at Raytheon as the senior corporate business development lead for air intelligence programs. He also worked for L-3 Communications’ Wescam/Sonoma Electro Optic (EO) imaging systems as a director of business development for airborne intelligence, surveillance, and reconnaissance (ISR) sensors. Wilson was also an aerospace consultant with the Goyak Group specializing in national security, foreign policy, and business development.

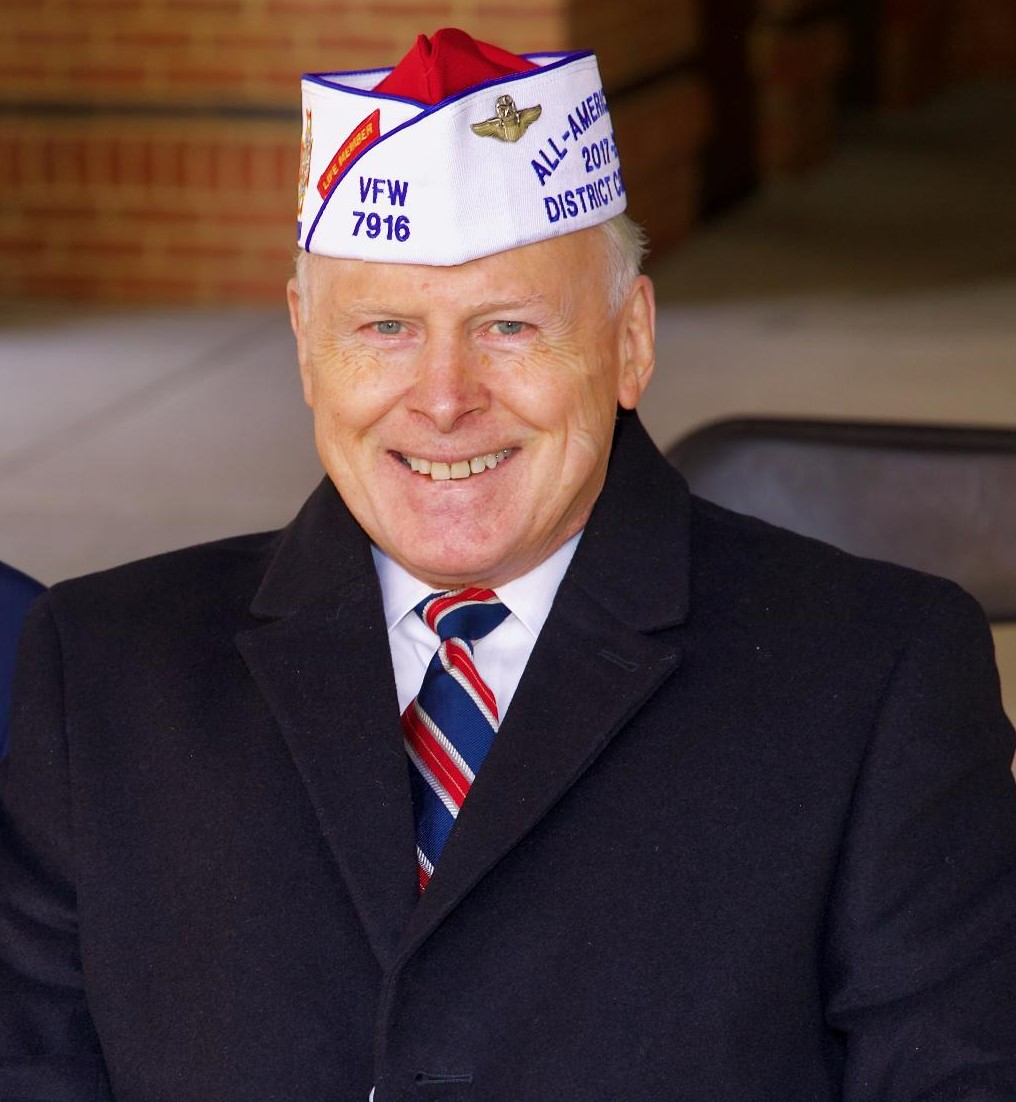
Wilson at the Quantico National Cemetery Veterans Day ceremony in 2019

Wilson remains active in the aerospace community as a volunteer for a number of organizations. He is a docent and military aviation lecturer at the Smithsonian National Air and Space Museum's (NASM) Steven F. Udvar-Hazy Center annex at Washington Dulles International Airport in Virginia. In 2016, he spoke at Freedom Museum in Manassas, Virginia about his USAF career as a U-2 pilot. In 2017, Wilson appeared in the documentary, The Dragon Lady, from the Smithsonian Channel’s Air Warriors series of videos. In 2019, he was elected chairman of The Cold War Museum’s Board of Directors. Wilson is a member of the Order of Daedalians and in 2019 served as chaplain of Daedalian Flight 4, the National Capital Flight, in Fort Myer, Virginia.

In veterans' affairs, Wilson has served in increasingly responsible leadership roles. In 2015, Wilson commanded the Veterans of Foreign Wars (VFW) Hawkins-Reeve Post 7916 where he was awarded "All State" and "All American" honors recognizing exceptional leadership and accomplishment in membership growth and participation in key programs. On February 23, 2016, Wilson addressed the Senate of Virginia to stress the importance of House Bill 63 that would bring Virginia law in accordance with Federal law by exempting veteran service organizations from local taxation. House Bill 63 was approved by the Virginia assembly and signed into law by the governor. Later in 2016, Wilson was elected chairman of the Potomac Region Veterans Council where he represented over 15,000 veterans in 29 veteran service organizations. In 2017, Wilson transitioned to commander of Virginia District 10, where he again achieved "All State" and "All American" honors. In 2025, Wilson's career was chronicled by the Americans Wartime Experience's Voices of Freedom project.

As of 2015, Wilson and his wife, Judy, have four children and four grandchildren.

=== Awards and decorations ===
Wilson was awarded the following decorations for his military service. Based on his assignments, he was also authorized to wear the Office of the Secretary of Defense Identification Badge and Air Force Commander Badge.

Badge	USAF Command pilot		
Row 1	Defense Superior Service Medal		
Row 2	Legion of Merit	Defense Meritorious Service Medal	Meritorious Service Medal w/ 4 oak leaf clusters
Row 3	Air Medal w/ 1 oak leaf cluster	Aerial Achievement Medal w/ 1 oak leaf cluster	Air Force Commendation Medal w/ 1 oak leaf cluster
Row 4	Joint Meritorious Unit Award	Air Force Outstanding Unit Award w/ a silver oak leaf cluster	Combat Readiness Medal w/ 1 oak leaf cluster
Row 5	National Defense Service Medal w/ 1 service star	Korea Defense Service Medal	Armed Forces Expeditionary Medal w/ 2 service stars
Row 6	Southwest Asia Service Medal w/ 1 service star	Humanitarian Service Medal	Air Force Overseas Short Tour Service Ribbon
Row 7	Air Force Longevity Service Award with a silver oak leaf cluster	Small Arms Expert Marksmanship Ribbon w/ 1 service star	Air Force Training Ribbon
Badge	Joint Chiefs of Staff Identification Badge		

=== Other achievements ===
The US Department of State twice selected him for the Superior Honor Award for leadership in the Global War on Terror, Operation Enduring Freedom, and Operation Iraqi Freedom. The United Way honored Wilson twice with their "Citizen of the Year" award.

== See also ==
- 4404th Wing (Provisional)
- Black Cat Squadron
