= Eugene D. Santarelli =

US Air Force officer (born c. 1943)

Lieutenant General Eugene D. Santarelli
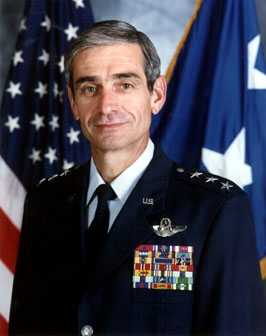
- Lieutenant General Eugene D. Santarelli, USAF, c. 1995
- Born: August 14, 1944; Canton, Ohio
- Died: September 21, 2023 (aged 79); Tucson, Arizona
- Education: University of Notre Dame (BBA); Troy State University (MS)
- Military career
- Allegiance: United States
- Branch: United States Air Force
- Service years: 1966-1998
- Rank: Lieutenant General
- Commands: 17th Air Force; 355th Wing; 4404th Composite Wing (Provisional); 836th Air Division; 52nd Tactical Fighter Wing
- Awards: Legion of Merit (2); Distinguished Flying Cross (3); Meritorious Service Medal (3); Air Medal (30); Aerial Achievement Medal (2); Air Force Commendation Medal (3); Combat Readiness Medal (2)

Lieutenant General Eugene D. Santarelli (August 14, 1944 - September 21, 2023) was a United States Air Force officer who last served as vice commander of Pacific Air Forces from July 1995 to November 1998. The command is responsible for Air Force activities covering the Pacific region, serving at 12 major locations, primarily in Hawaii, Alaska, South Korea, Japan and Guam.

Santarelli entered the Air Force through the Reserve Officer Training Corps program in 1966 after graduating from the University of Notre Dame. He commanded a numbered air force, an air division and three wings, as well as being executive officer to the Air Force chief of staff. He was a command pilot with more than 3,600 hours in fighter aircraft, including 901 combat hours in the F-4 Phantom which he earned during two tours in Southeast Asia.

== Education ==
- 1966 Bachelor of business administration, University of Notre Dame, South Bend, Ind.
- 1972 Squadron Officer School, Maxwell Air Force Base, Ala.
- 1978 Air Command and Staff College, Maxwell Air Force Base, Ala.
- 1980 Master of science degree in military arts and sciences, U.S. Army Command and General Staff College, Fort Leavenworth, Kan.
- 1981 Master of science degree in administration, Troy State University, Ala.
- 1985 Air War College, Maxwell Air Force Base, Ala.
- 1993 National and International Security Management Course, Harvard University, Mass.

== Military assignments ==
1. September 1966 - September 1967, student, pilot training, Laughlin Air Force Base, Texas
2. September 1967 - August 1968, student, F-4, 56th Tactical Fighter Wing, MacDill Air Force Base, Fla.
3. August 1968 - July 1969, F-4 pilot systems operator, 497th Tactical Fighter Squadron, Ubon Royal Thai Air Force Base, Thailand
4. July 1969 - May 1970, F-4 aircraft commander upgrade training, 56th Tactical Fighter Wing, MacDill Air Force Base, Fla.
5. May 1970 - April 1971, F-4 aircraft commander, 497th Tactical Fighter Squadron, Ubon Royal Thai Air Force Base, Thailand
6. April 1971- September 1972, F-4 aircraft commander and instructor pilot, 335th Tactical Fighter Squadron, Seymour Johnson Air Force Base, N.C.
7. September 1972 - December 1973, officer resource manager, fighter reconnaissance branch, Air Force Military Personnel Center, Randolph Air Force Base, Texas
8. January 1974 - June 1974, special assistant to the director of operations, 57th Fighter Weapons Wing, Nellis Air Force Base, Nev.
9. July 1974 - March 1976, student, F-4 Fighter Weapons Instructor Course; then, F-4 Fighter Weapons School instructor, 414th Fighter Weapons Squadron, Nellis Air Force Base, Nev.
10. April 1976 - May 1979, F-4E weapons instructor; then chief, wing weapons and tactics division; later F-15A instructor pilot, flight commander and operations officer, 525th Tactical Fighter Squadron, Bitburg Air Base, West Germany
11. June 1979 - May 1980, student, U.S. Army Command and General Staff College, Fort Leavenworth, Kan.
12. June 1980 - October 1982, chief, air to air weapons branch, directorate of requirements, later assistant for senior officer management, directorate of personnel, Headquarters Tactical Air Command, Langley Air Force Base, Va.
13. November 1982 - July 1984, assistant deputy commander for operations, 363rd Tactical Fighter Wing, Shaw Air Force Base, S.C.
14. August 1984 - June 1985, student, Air War College, Maxwell Air Force Base, Ala.
15. June 1985 - May 1987, chief, Air Force Counsel, then director, Air Force Board Structure, Headquarters U.S. Air Force, Washington, D.C.
16. June 1987 - June 1989, vice commander, then commander, 52nd Tactical Fighter Wing, Spangdahlem Air Base, West Germany
17. July 1989 - June 1990, executive officer to the Air Force chief of staff, Headquarters U.S. Air Force, Washington, D.C.
18. July 1990 - September 1993, commander, 836th Air Division, then commander, 355th Wing, Davis-Monthan Air Force Base, Ariz. (June 1991- December 1991, commander, U.S. Central Command Air Forces (Forward) and commander, 4404th Composite Wing (Provisional), Saudi Arabia)
19. September 1993 - February 1995, commander, 17th Air Force and Interim Combined Air Operations Center 3, Sembach Air Base, Germany
20. March 1995 - July 1995, director of operations, Headquarters Pacific Air Forces, Hickam Air Force Base, Hawaii
21. July 1995 - November 1998, vice commander, Headquarters Pacific Air Forces, Hickam Air Force Base, Hawaii

== Flight information ==
Rating: Command Pilot
Flight Hours: More than 4,100, including over 3,600 hours in fighter aircraft
Combat Flight Hours: 901 Hours
Aircraft flown: F-4, F-15, F-16, A-10, OA-10, OV-10, T-39, EC-130, C-130, C-20, C-21 and C-9

== Effective dates of promotion ==
Insignia	Rank	Date of rank
	Second Lieutenant	September 4, 1966
	First Lieutenant	March 4, 1968
	Captain	September 4, 1969
	Major	July 8, 1977
	Lieutenant Colonel	July 8, 1980
	Colonel	December 1, 1983
	Brigadier General	August 1, 1990
	Major General	June 1, 1993
	Lieutenant General	July 1, 1995
