= The Cold War Museum =

Coordinates: 38.7431°N 77.6765°W

- The Cold War Museum's location in northeast Virginia
- Established: 1996
- Location: Warrenton, Virginia
- Type: History Museum
- Founders: Francis Gary Powers Jr. John C. Welch
- Executive director: Dr. Jason Hall
- Chairperson: Charles Wilson
- Website: https://coldwar.org/

The Cold War Museum is a history museum located at Vint Hill Farms Station in Warrenton, Virginia, concentrating on Cold War history.

The museum was founded in 1996 by Francis Gary Powers Jr. (son of CIA U-2 pilot Francis Gary Powers) and John C. Welch to preserve Cold War history, honor Cold War veterans, and provide continuing education about the Cold War.

== Collection and Holdings ==
The Cold War Museum has a multimillion-dollar collection of artifacts on display, on loan, or in storage. Museum holdings include but are not limited to artifacts from the 1948–1949 Berlin Airlift, the 1960 U-2 incident, a 5,000-square-foot (460 m^{2}) display on the Cuban Missile Crisis that includes a Soviet SA-2 missile and material from the USS Liberty Incident, USS Pueblo Incident, Corona spy satellites, and the Space Race. They boast the largest collection of Civil Defense items in the United States, having saved and salvaged the former Civil Defense headquarters for Washington, DC.

The museum has displays on signals intelligence (SIGINT), image intelligence (IMINT), and a large collection of Soviet and East German flags, banners, regalia, uniforms, and equipment. The museum has also acquired a yellow East German Trabant automobile currently in storage, the mailbox used by Aldrich Ames to contact his Soviet handlers, and a Stasi Prison Door from the infamous Hohenschönhausen Prison facility in East Berlin. The Mailbox and Stasi prison door are currently on loan to the International Spy Museum in Washington, DC. Vint Hill Farm Station and its listening post history during World War II and the Cold War are highlighted as a museum exhibit.

== Educational Activities and Publications ==
The museum has developed various educational programs and activities to help educate future generation about the Cold War. Museum speakers have visited numerous grade schools, high schools, colleges, and universities in order to teach students about the Cold War. The museum has been the backdrop for numerous programs aired on the History Channel, the Discovery Channel, A&E Television Networks, the Learning Channel, C-SPAN, and numerous public access stations.

The mobile exhibit on the U-2 Incident, on loan from Francis Gary Powers, Jr., is currently displayed at the Strategic Air Command and Aerospace Museum near Omaha, Nebraska. The exhibit has been displayed at many museums across the United States and internationally. The traveling exhibit helps to promote The Cold War Museum.

On October 14, 2006, the museum hosted an international conference to commemorate the 50th Anniversary of the 1956 Hungarian and Polish Crises. Dr. Sergei Khrushchev, the son of Nikita Khrushchev, and David Eisenhower, grandson of President Dwight D. Eisenhower participated with VIPs from Hungary and Poland and well renowned scholars. The Hungarian and Polish Embassies, American Hungarian Federation, Fairfax County Economic Development Authority, the Hungarian Technology Center, the Cold War Museum, and the South County Secondary School cohosted the program. Sponsors included EnviroSolutions, Inc., K. Hovnanian Homes, Marriott Fairfax at Fair Oaks, Northern Virginia Community College, Verizon, and Vulcan Materials Company.

On October 2, 2007, Cold War Conversations-II took place to commemorate the 50th Anniversary of the 1957 launch of Sputnik. Dr. Sergei Khrushchev, the son of Nikita Khrushchev and author of Memoirs of Nikita Khrushchev 1953–1964 and Paul Dickson, author of Sputnik—Shock of the Century discussed this important Cold War historical event. Dialog between the two and Q&A from the audience followed their presentations. The Marriott Washington Dulles Airport Hotel, Northern Virginia Community College – Loudoun Campus, NASA, and The Cold War Museum were event sponsors.

The museum worked with the Embassy of the Czech Republic to commemorate the 40th anniversary of the Prague Spring and with the British Berlin Airlift Association to commemorate the 60th anniversary of the Berlin Airlift.

On October 27, 2012, Cold War Conversations-IV took place to commemorate the 50th Anniversary of the Cuban Missile Crisis Cuban Missile Crisis. Dr. Sergei Khrushchev, the son of Nikita Khrushchev, USAF U-2 pilot Buddy Brown, and photographic interpreter Dino Brugioni were part of the distinguished panel that discussed this important Cold War historical event. The first panel was recorded and is available on YouTube. George Mason University, the Cold War International History project, and The Cold War Museum were event sponsors.

Periodically, The Cold War Museum hosts an online Cold War Conversation lecture series for authors and related experts. The Cold War Times is an online publication produced for Cold War veterans, students, and other interested parties.

In 1997, Congressman Tom Davis, with the assistance of The Cold War Museum, drafted legislation for the creation of a "Cold War Memorial" that will honor all the men and women who were part of Cold War events and activities.

== Lease, Status and Chapters ==
The museum signed a lease on December 1, 2009, with the Vint Hill Economic Development Authority for the use of a two-story building and a secure storage facility at Vint Hill Farms Station, Virginia, in Fauquier County, 30 miles (48 km) from Washington Dulles International Airport. Vint Hill Farms is a 695-acre former United States Army communications base. The museum opened on November 11, 2011. The museum is open on weekends and midweek by appointment.

The Cold War Museum is a 501(c)(3) tax-exempt charitable organization. The museum is working with the International Spy Museum in Washington, DC. and the Strategic Air Command and Aerospace Museum near Omaha, Nebraska to temporarily display some of its artifacts.

The Cold War Museum has a chapter in the American Midwest based in Waukesha, Wisconsin,.

== See also ==
- Tagansky Protected Command Point - Cold War museum in Moscow, Russia.
- Plokštinė missile base - Cold War museum in Lithuania.
- Wende Museum - Cold War museum in Culver City, California.
- Strategic missile forces museum - Strategic Missile Forces museum with an exhibitions related to a Cold War in Ukraine
