= 4404th Wing (Provisional) =

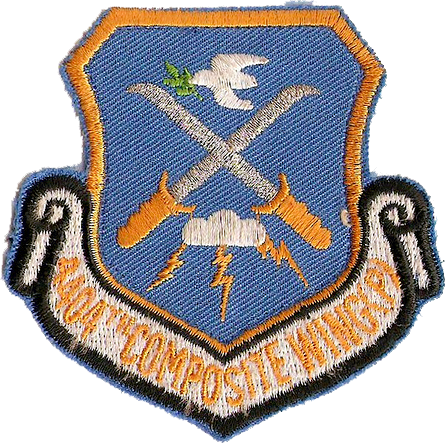
- Emblem of the 4404th Composite Wing (Provisional)
- Active: 1991-1998
- Country: United States
- Branch: United States Air Force
- Part of: Air Forces Central Command

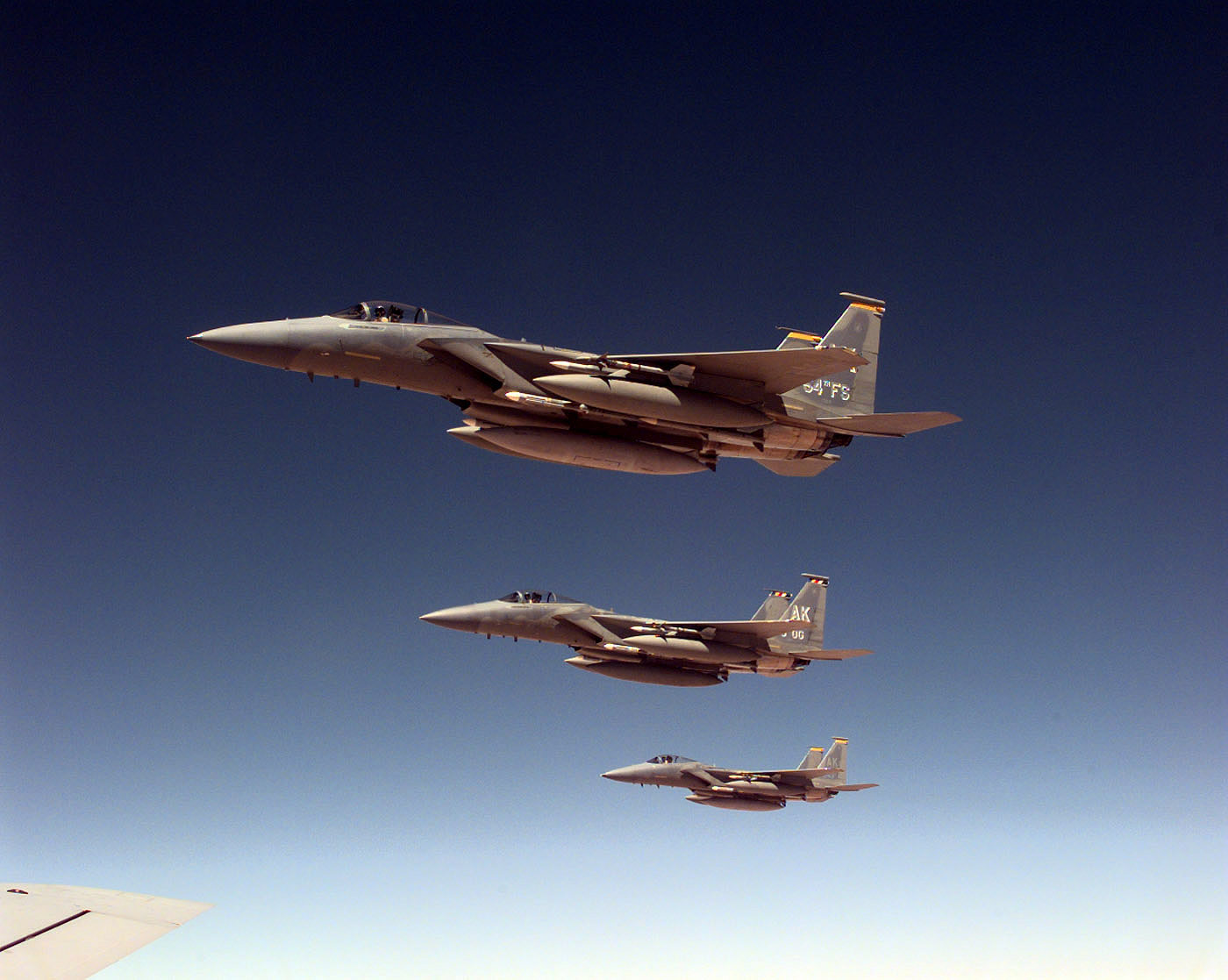
4404th Wing (Provisional) F-15C Eagles fly a routine patrol mission over Southern Iraq on 4 April 1998, in support of Operation Southern Watch.

The 4404th Wing (Provisional) is an inactive United States Air Force unit. It was last assigned to the Air Combat Command (ACC), stationed at Prince Sultan Air Base, Saudi Arabia.

The mission of the 4404th Wing (Provisional) was to serve as the front line defense against possible Iraqi aggression after the 1991 Gulf War. It enforced the U.S./British imposed Iraqi no-fly zones and protected U.S. Department of Defense forces stationed in Kuwait, the United Arab Emirates and Saudi Arabia. The wing was inactivated on 1 December 1998.

== History ==
Established by Tactical Air Command at Prince Sultan Air Base, Al Kharj, Saudi Arabia, to partially replace provisional air divisions established during the 1991 Gulf War. The original aircraft, personnel, and equipment of the 4404th TFW came from the 4th TFW (Provisional), which had operated during the Gulf War. In June 1991 the wing relocated to King Abdul Aziz Air Base, Dahran, where it was officially activated as the 4404th Wing (Provisional) on 2 August 1991.

From the start of Operation Southern Watch, the Wing was structured and manned to carry out a temporary mission, insuring that Iraq complied with the post-Operation Desert Storm United Nations sanctions. A Major Air Command controlled unit is created for a limited time to accomplish a specific mission. It later was engaged in (Operation Provide Comfort, and later Operation Northern Watch were commanded by the US European Command (EUCOM)). The wing consisted of six provisional groups assigned at nine locations in the Persian Gulf region, including Riyadh, Saudi Arabia, and Kuwait.

In 1993 then Lieutenant Colonel Chuck Wilson commanded the 4402nd Reconnaissance Squadron (Provisional) (4402 RS), known as the Desert Dragons, at Taif Air Base, Saudi Arabia. The 4402 RS was formed to continue reconnaissance operations over Iraq after the end of the 1991 Gulf War in order to ensure compliance with United Nations (UN) resolutions. U-2s from the 4402 RS flew Olive Branch missions to look for imagery evidence of Iraqi weapons of mass destruction. The Iraqi government did not approve of these overflights, and Wilson's first U-2 mission was targeted by Iraqi anti-aircraft weapons. The U-2s operating in-theater at this time had outdated defensive capabilities. Wilson's mission report was instrumental in obtaining funding for the "Band Aid" upgrades to the U-2's defensive systems.

During the 1990s and early 2000s, more than 5,000 airmen made up the wing, manned primarily by airmen who rotated to Saudi Arabia on temporary duty assignments. During Operation Vigilant Warrior, the number of personnel peaked at about 7000. However, the wing was manned at minimum levels. This policy was intended to reduce the visibility of U.S. forces in Saudi Arabia, limit exposure to risk, reduce the impact on Air Force units worldwide from whom the airmen were assigned, and insure that they were fully committed during their short tours of duty. This manning provided little flexibility to respond to changes in threat or mission requirements.

Air Force flying squadrons were assigned as units to the 4404th Operations Group (Provisional) on 15-, 30-, 45-, 60-, and 90-day rotations depending on the type unit. Air Expeditionary Force III forces that deployed to Qatar from July through August 1996 were under the operational control of the 4404th Wing (Provisional), under the tactical control of either the Commander, Joint Task Force-Southwest Asia or the Commander, Joint Task Force-Rugged Nautilus (for which see ), but for force protection were under U.S. Liaison Office, Qatar which does not have the command authority to direct force protection actions.

After a terrorist truck bomb killed 19 airmen at Dhahran in June 1996 (Khobar Towers bombing), the wing was ordered to move to more secure location within the Kingdom of Saudi Arabia. As a result, it was moved back to Prince Sultan Air Base.

It was inactivated on 1 December 1998 as part of the implementation of the Air Expeditionary Force (AEF) concept. It was superseded ("reflagged") by the 363d Air Expeditionary Wing.

=== Lineage ===
- Activated by Tactical Air Command as 4404th Tactical Fighter Wing (Provisional) on 13 March 1991

Assumed equipment and personnel of 4th Tactical Fighter Wing (Provisional)

Re-designated: 4404th Composite Wing (Provisional), 17 June 1991
Re-designated: 4404th Wing (Provisional), 1 January 1993
Inactivated on: 1 December 1998

=== Assignments ===
- United States Central Command Air Forces, 13 March 1991
- Air Combat Command, 2 June 1992 – 1 October 1988

Attached to: Joint Task Force Southwest Asia, United States Central Command, MacDill AFB, Florida

=== Units ===
Groups

- 4404th Operations Group (Provisional)

Reflagged as: 363d Expeditionary Operations Group

- 4404th Logistics Group (Provisional)

Reflagged as: 363d Expeditionary Logistics Group

- 4404th Support Group (Provisional)

Reflagged as: 363d Expeditionary Support Group

- 4409th Air Base Group (Provisional), Eskan Village

Assets and personnel reflagged as 320th Air Expeditionary Group, 1 December 1998

Squadrons
4402d Reconnaissance Squadron (Provisional)

Re-designated as: 363d Expeditionary Reconnaissance Squadron

- 4405th Airborne Warning And Control Squadron (Provisional) (ACC)

Re-designated as 4405th Airborne Air Control Squadron (Provisional)

4407th Reconnaissance Squadron (Provisional)

Re-designated as: 763d Expeditionary Reconnaissance Squadron

4408th Air Refueling Squadron (AFRES)(November 1994)
4410th Airlift Squadron (Provisional)

Re-designated as: 363rd Expeditionary Airlift Squadron
Detachment 1 operated from Seeb Air Base, Oman

4418th Airlift Squadron (Provisional)

Re-designated as: 763rd Expeditionary Airlift Squadron

4413th Air Refueling Squadron (Provisional)

Re-designated as: 763d Expeditionary Air Refueling Squadron

4416th Intelligence Sq (Provisional) (AIA)

Re-designated as: 12th Expeditionary Intelligence Squadron

1621st Air Mobility Support Squadron Provisional (MAC/AMC)

Re-designated as: 8th Expeditionary Air Mobility Support Squadron (AMC)

Also reported was the 4411th Rescue Squadron (Provisional) flying Lockheed MC-130s.

Squadrons were manned and equipped from units in the United States, PACAF, USAFE and Alaskan Air Command on a rotating basis.

=== Stations ===
- King Al Kharj Air Base, Saudi Arabia, 13 March 1991
- King Abdulaziz Air Base, Saudi Arabia, 17 June 1991
- Prince Sultan Air Base, Saudi Arabia, 19 June 1996 – 1 October 1998

=== Aircraft ===
Fighters

- F-4G
- F-15C
- F-15E
- F-16

Electronic combat

- E-3
- EF-111A
- EC-130

Aerial refueling

- KC-135
- KC-10

Reconnaissance

- RC-135
- U-2

Cargo/troop transport

- C-130
- C-21

Search and rescue

- HC-130
