= Defense Airborne Reconnaissance Office =

The Defense Airborne Reconnaissance Office was an office within the United States Department of Defense, responsible to the Under Secretary of Defense. It was established on November 6, 1993. The office was created to provide increased support from senior management toward airborne reconnaissance systems. At the time of its first operation, it had two offices, one of which was located within the Pentagon, with the other located at the National Reconnaissance Office Westfields facility. The office was responsible for the budget and had oversight of the Defense Airborne Reconnaissance Program, a program with US$2 billion in funding.

According to U.S. Department of Defense directive 5134.11 the office was empowered to "management oversight of the development and acquisition of all joint Military Department and Defense-wide airborne reconnaissance capabilities, encompassing manned and unmanned aerial vehicles, their sensors, data links, data relays, and ground stations, to include modifications of Military Department- and Defense Agency-unique ground stations to achieve and maintain interoperability." The office was a R & D and procurement office, comparable to the National Reconnaissance Office.

The office was created in response to a communication from the Congressional Authorization Conference stressing a military attitude of the post-Cold War, that "tactical reconnaissance is relatively more important to national security than at any other time in our history".

K. Meiners held the position of Director of Advanced Technology for a time.
