= 763rd Expeditionary Air Refueling Squadron =

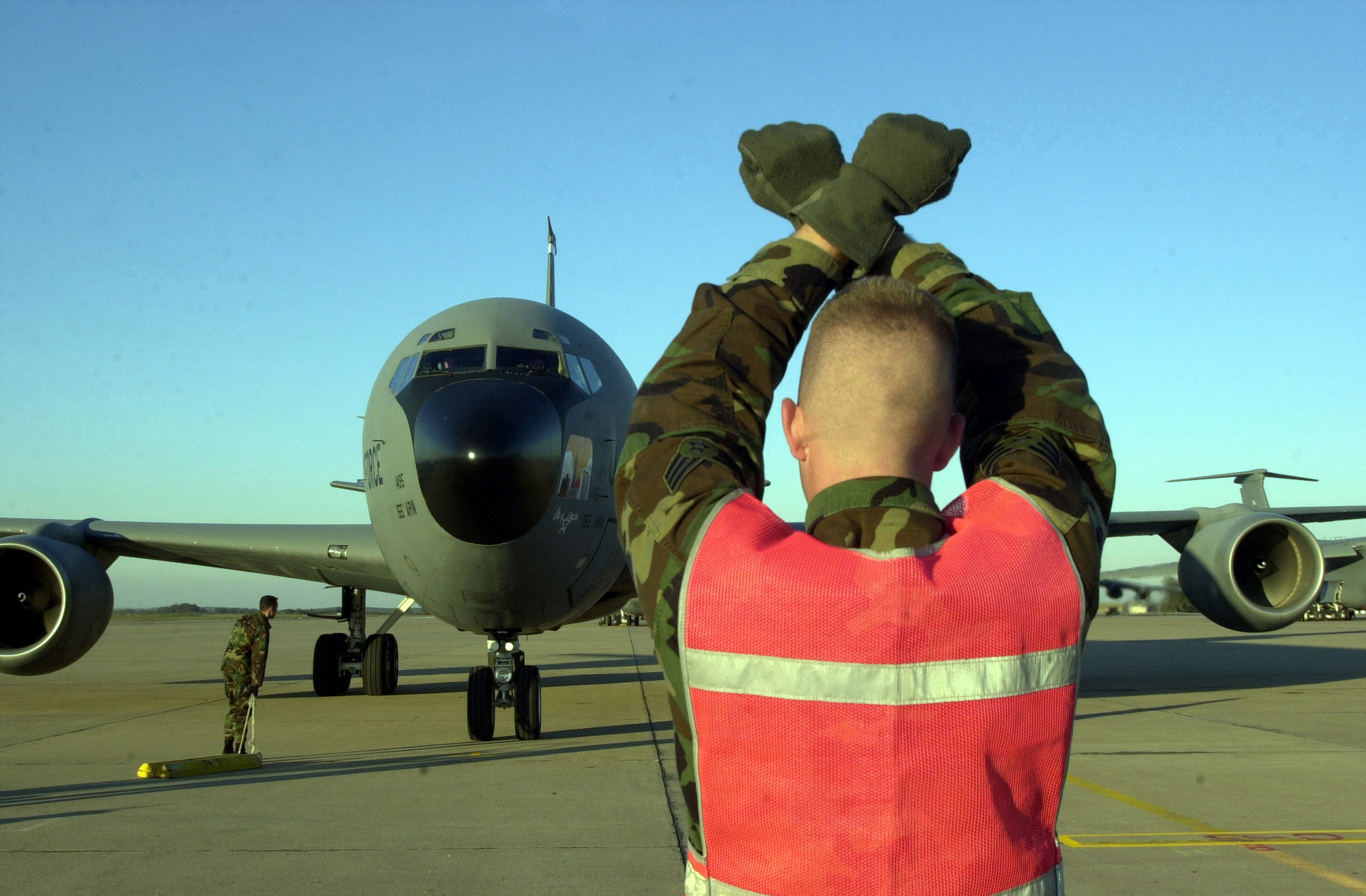
- KC-135R Stratotanker deployed to Southwest Asia
- Active: 1998–2003
- Country: United States
- Branch: United States Air Force
- Role: air refueling
- Engagements: Iraq War
- Decorations: Air Force Outstanding Unit Award with Combat "V" Device

Insignia
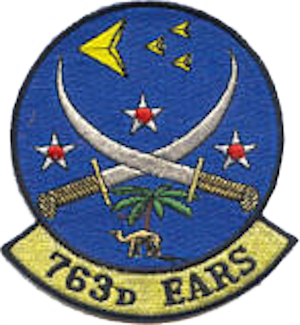
- Patch with 763rd Expeditionary Air Refueling Squadron emblem

The 763rd Expeditionary Air Refueling Squadron is a provisional United States Air Force unit. It was last known to be assigned to the 363rd Expeditionary Operations Group at Al Dhafra Air Base, United Arab Emirates. The 363rd Group was inactivated on 25 August 2003. The squadron's current status is undetermined.

== History ==
The squadron was activated by assuming the personnel of the 4413th Air Refueling Squadron, Provisional, on 1 December 1998. Its mission was to provide combat refueling of coalition aircraft assigned to United States Air Forces Central, primarily as part of Operation Southern Watch. It supported Operation Enduring Freedom beginning in 2002, and Operation Iraqi Freedom in 2003. Its headquarters, the 363rd Expeditionary Operations Group, was inactivated on 25 August 2003 with the closing of United States facilities at Prince Sultan Air Base, Saudi Arabia.

== Lineage ==
- Activated as the 763rd Expeditionary Air Refueling Squadron on 1 December 1998

Inactivated c. 25 August 2003

=== Assignments ===
- 363rd Expeditionary Operations Group, 1 December 1998 – c. 23 August 2003

=== Stations ===
- Al Dhafra Air Base, United Arab Emirates, 1 Dec 1998 – ? c. 23 August 2003

=== Aircraft ===
- Boeing KC-135 Stratotanker, 1998–?

=== Awards and campaigns ===
Award streamer	Award	Dates	Notes
	Air Force Outstanding Unit Award with Combat "V" Device	1 June 1999–31 May 2001	
	Air Force Outstanding Unit Award with Combat "V" Device	1 June 2001–31 May 2002	

Campaign Streamer	Campaign	Dates	Notes
	Liberation of Iraq	19 March 2003–1 May 2003	
	Global War on Terror Expeditionary Medal		
