= AIT platoon sergeant =

Former U.S. Army non-commissioned officer position

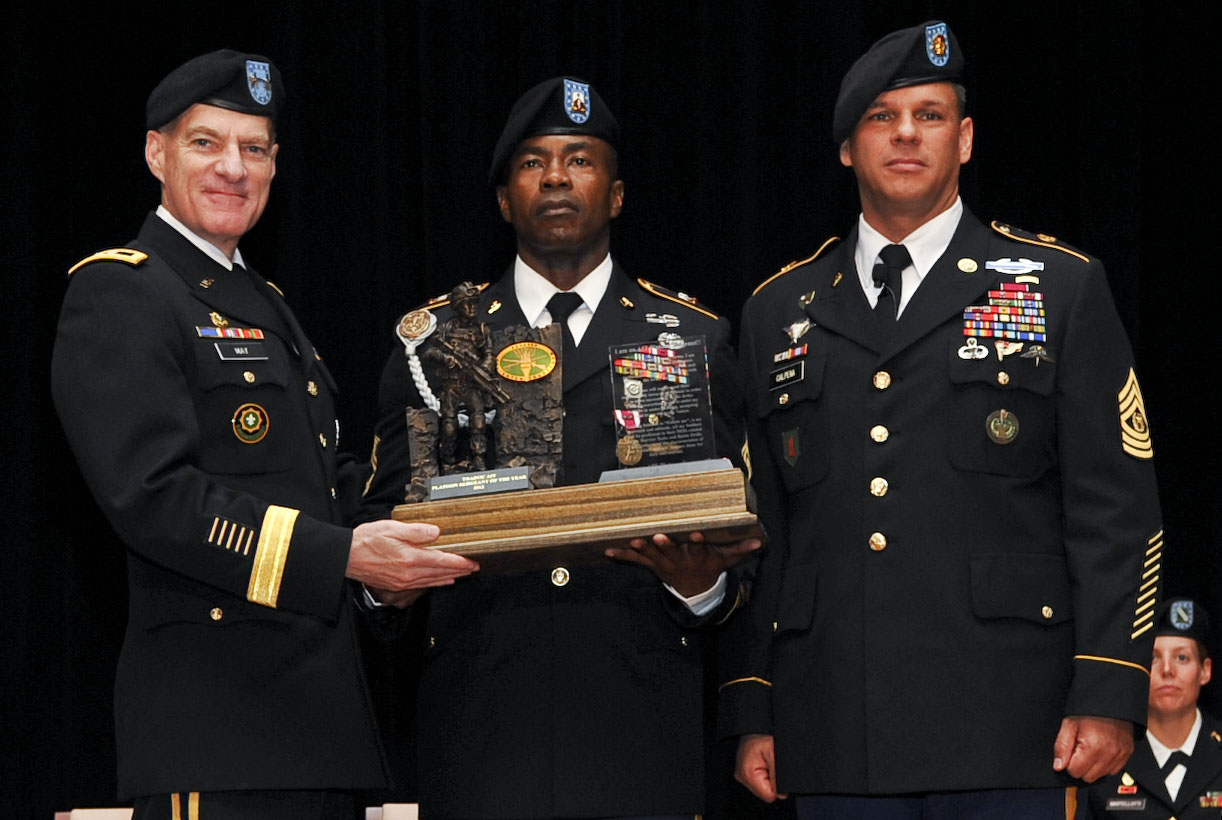
2012 AIT Platoon Sergeant Of The Year.

Advanced Individual Training platoon sergeants were United States Army non-commissioned officers (NCOs) responsible for the health, welfare, mentoring, disciplining, physical fitness, and "Warrior-Task" training of soldiers attending Advanced Individual Training (AIT) after having graduated Basic Combat Training (BCT). NCOs in the enlisted grades of E-6 or E-7 were assigned as AIT platoon sergeants and incurred a minimum 24-month tour of duty. AIT platoon sergeants replaced Army drill sergeants (who previously were responsible for soldiers attending both BCT and AIT) during a transitional period from 2007 to 2008. The program was discontinued in 2018 and drill sergeants returned to AIT.

== History ==
On July 31, 2007, the AIT platoon sergeant program was initiated. Prior to this, drill sergeants were responsible for managing AIT soldiers. The Army replaced AIT drill sergeants as a way of allowing AIT instructors to serve in leadership roles as squad leaders, further enabling the platoon sergeant to manage the platoon in the same manner he or she would in an operational unit. It also allowed soldiers to feel more comfortable addressing both personal and professional issues with the platoon sergeant. The Army believed that the intimidating leadership style of Army drill sergeants seemed better-suited for developing new recruits in BCT. AIT platoon sergeants did not wear the signature campaign hat that their predecessor drill sergeants wore. Pilot programs for the position were tested at Fort Lee, VA; Fort Bliss, TX; and Fort Jackson, SC.

Platoon sergeants were replaced in 2018, with the Army indicating that platoon sergeants were not respected in the same manner that drill sergeants were. Serving platoon sergeants were "converted" into drill sergeants, earning the right to wear the campaign hat and Drill Sergeant Identification Badge via a 10-day "conversion" course.

== Training ==
The AIT platoon sergeant course was a six-week school taught at the U.S. Army Drill Sergeant Academy, Fort Jackson, SC. The course was the first six-weeks of the U.S. Army Drill Sergeant Course, with AIT platoon sergeant candidates training alongside drill sergeant candidates. NCOs were trained on the following course modules:

- Applying TRADOC's Training Guidance & Investment Strategy
- Effectively Educate and Train as IET Leaders
- Enforce Wellness and Fitness in AIT
- Demonstrate Competency in Warrior Tasks and Battle Drills
- Lead squad /platoon size elements in AIT
- Manage and mitigate risks by using the Composite Risk Management
- Differentiate IET components and utilize support systems in producing quality Soldiers

Candidates were assigned the Skill Qualification Identifier of 'Y' upon successful completion of the course

After the platoon sergeant program ended in 2018, all BCT or AIT drill sergeants attend the identical drill sergeant course, still located at the U.S. Army Drill Sergeant Academy. Both BCT and AIT drill sergeants are assigned the "H" Skill Qualification Identifier.
