= Developmental Special Duty Ribbon =

- Developmental Special Duty Ribbon
- Type: Ribbon
- Presented by: the Department of the Air Force
- Status: Currently awarded
- Established: 4 September 2014

Precedence
- Next (higher): Air Force Longevity Service Award
- Next (lower): Armed Forces Reserve Medal

The Developmental Special Duty Ribbon (DSDR) is a ribbon that is only awarded by the United States Department of the Air Force. Established 4 September 2014 by the Secretary of the Air Force, On 16 November 2020, the Air Force Special Duty Ribbon was renamed to the Developmental Special Duty Ribbon by the Secretary of the Air Force.

== Criteria ==
The Developmental Special Duty Ribbon is awarded to those service members who complete a special duty assignment, or are awarded a special duty Air Force Specialty Code or special duty assignment. The award is for service after 4 September 2014, and cannot be retroactively awarded. The following are qualifying special duty assignments:

- Commander, Cadet Squadron, USAFA (80C0)
- Training Commander, OTS (81C0)
- Instructor (81T0)
- Academic Program Manager (82A0
- Career Assistance Advisor (8A100)
- Military Training Instructor (8B000)
- Military Training Leader (8B100)
- USAFA Military Training (8B200)
- Airman and Family Readiness Center NCO (8C000)
- First Sergeant (8F000)
- Honor Guard (85G and 8G000)
- Recruiter (83R and 8R000)
- Professional Military Education (PME) Instructor (8T000)
- Airmen Dorm Leader (8H000)

== Appearance ==
The Developmental Special Duty Ribbon is a symmetrically striped ribbon 1 3/8 inches (35 mm) wide. At the outside edges of the ribbon are stripes of graphite blue and silver gray both 1/16 inch (1.6 mm) wide. Next is a broader stripe 3/16 inch (4.8 mm) wide of ultramarine blue, bordered on the inside by a stripe of silver gray next to a stripe of scarlet, both 1/16 inch (1.6 mm) wide. In the center of the ribbon is a white stripe 1/2 inch (13 mm) wide bisected by an ultramarine blue stripe 1/8 inch (3.2 mm) wide.

Subsequent awards of the Developmental Special Duty Ribbon are denoted by oak leaf clusters.
