= United States Army Basic Training =

Recruit training program of the United States Army

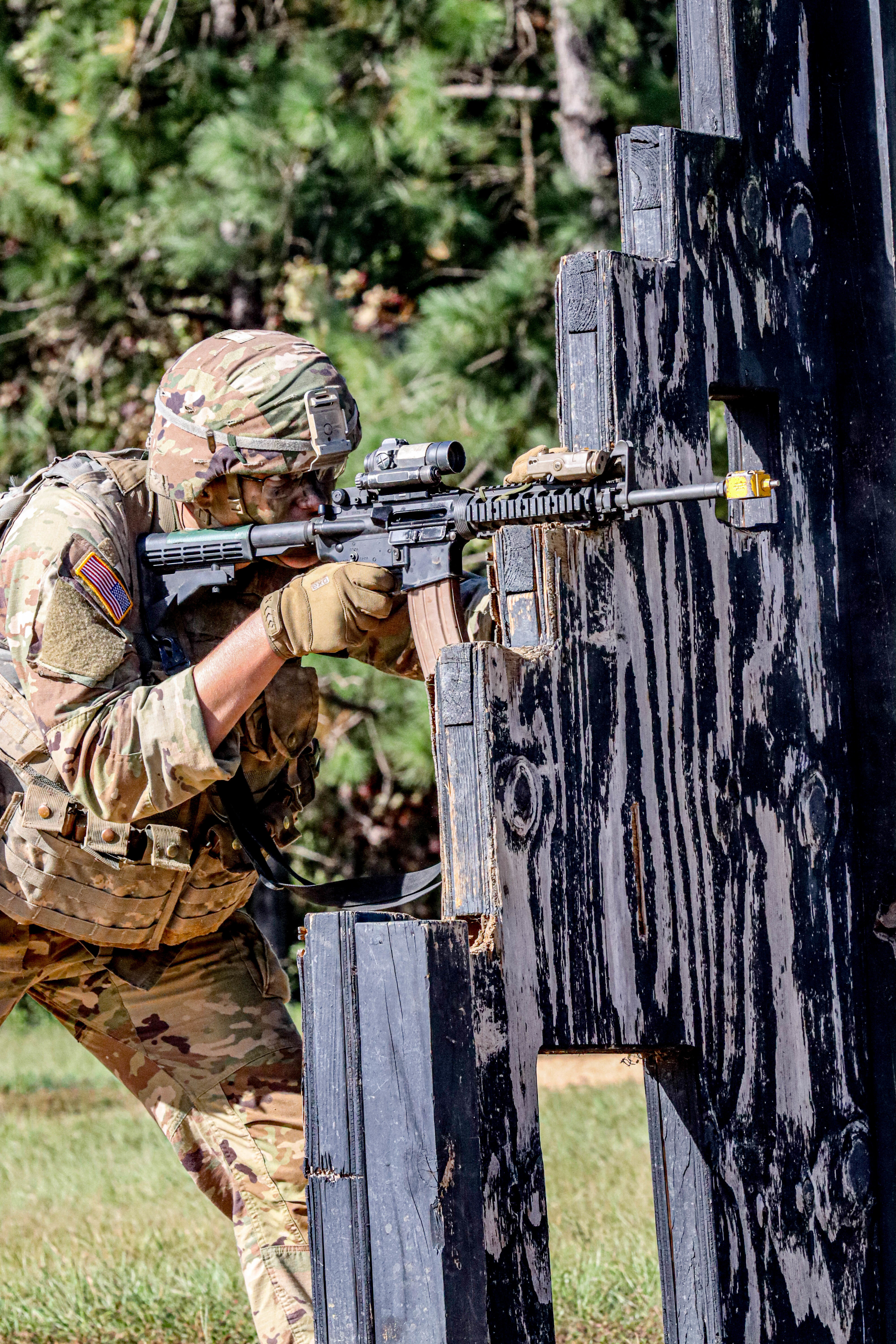
A soldier with E Company, 2nd Battalion, 58th Infantry Regiment, conducts Buddy Team Tactics at a Fort Benning Range

United States Army Basic Combat Training (BCT) is the recruit training program of the United States Army, for service in the U.S. Army, the U.S. Army Reserve, or the Army National Guard.

Initial entry training (IET) is divided into two parts: basic combat training (BCT) and advanced individual training (AIT).

Some trainees attend basic combat training along with their advanced individual training at one place, referred to as One Station Unit Training (OSUT). Infantry recruits go to Fort Benning, Georgia through One Station Unit Training program that is 22 weeks in duration.

Other occupations also learn basic warrior tasks and skills and small unit tactics, but tend to focus on more of a balanced approach. These trainees usually receive basic combat training at different installations including Fort Jackson, South Carolina; Fort Sill, Oklahoma; or Fort Leonard Wood, Missouri.

AIT consists of the remainder of the total basic training period and is where recruits train in the specifics of their chosen fields. As such, AIT is different for each available Army career path, or Military Occupational Specialty (MOS). AIT courses can last anywhere from 4 weeks to 7 months, and possibly more for foreign language training. Soldiers are still continually tested for physical fitness and weapons proficiency and are subject to the same duties, strict daily schedule and disciplinary rules as in BCT.

Upon completion of Basic Combat Training trainees earn the title of soldier.

== Quick overview: Army Basic Training ==
Length: ~10 weeks of BCT, plus Reception (in-processing) beforehand, followed by AIT/OSUT depending on MOS.

Phases:

- Red Phase (Weeks 1–3): Discipline, basic soldier skills, team drills, introduction to rucking, ACFT baseline, drill & ceremony, values, safety.
- White Phase (Weeks 4–6): Marksmanship (primary), zero/qual, land navigation, fieldcraft, longer rucks, tactical movements, combatives.
- Blue Phase (Weeks 7–9): Advanced field training, longer movements under load, medical/first aid lanes, culminating The Forge (capstone multi-day field exercise).
- Graduation Week (Week 10): Final admin, family day, out-processing to AIT or the unit.

== Overview ==
=== Drill sergeants ===
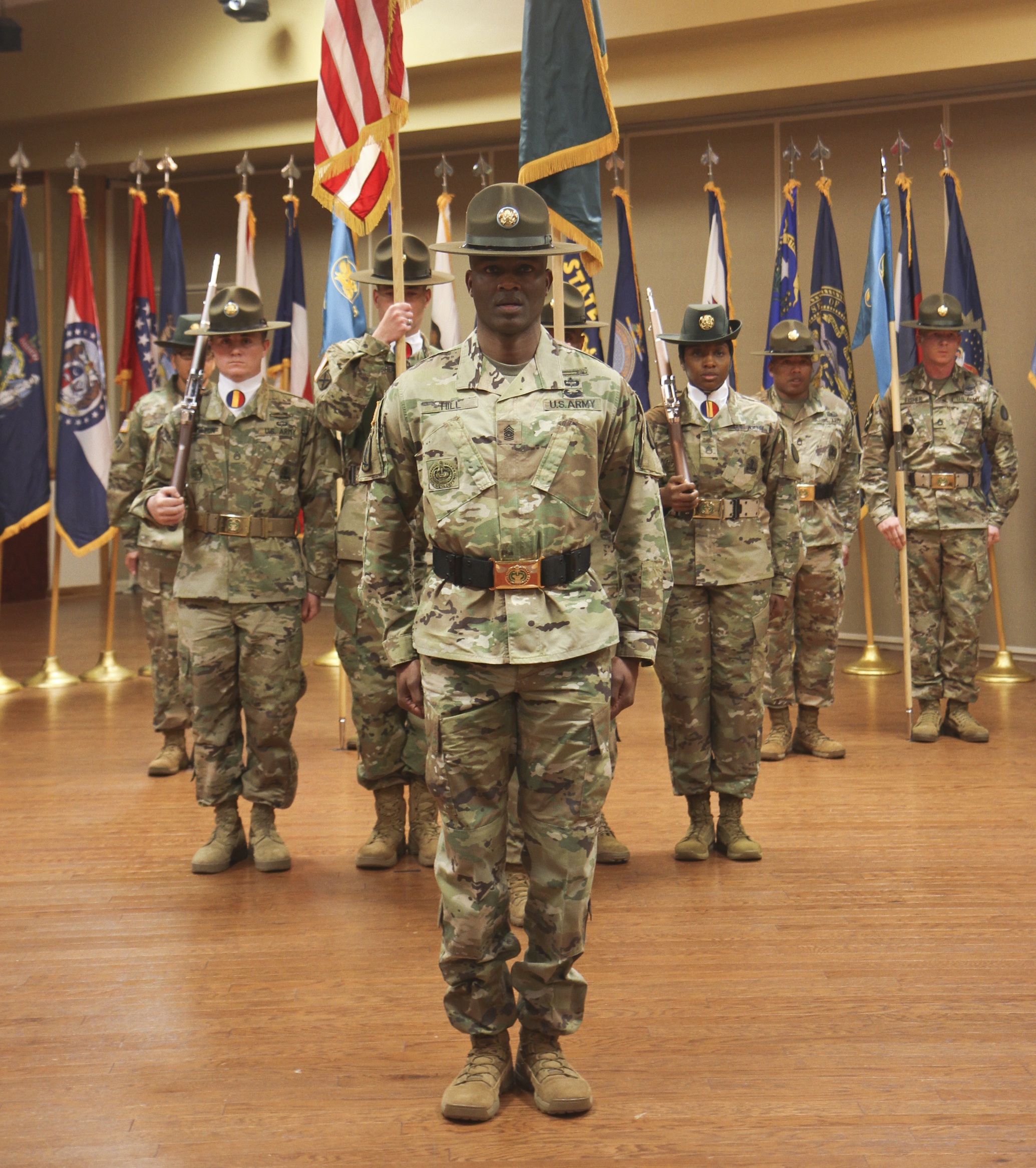
U.S. Army Drill Sergeant Academy.

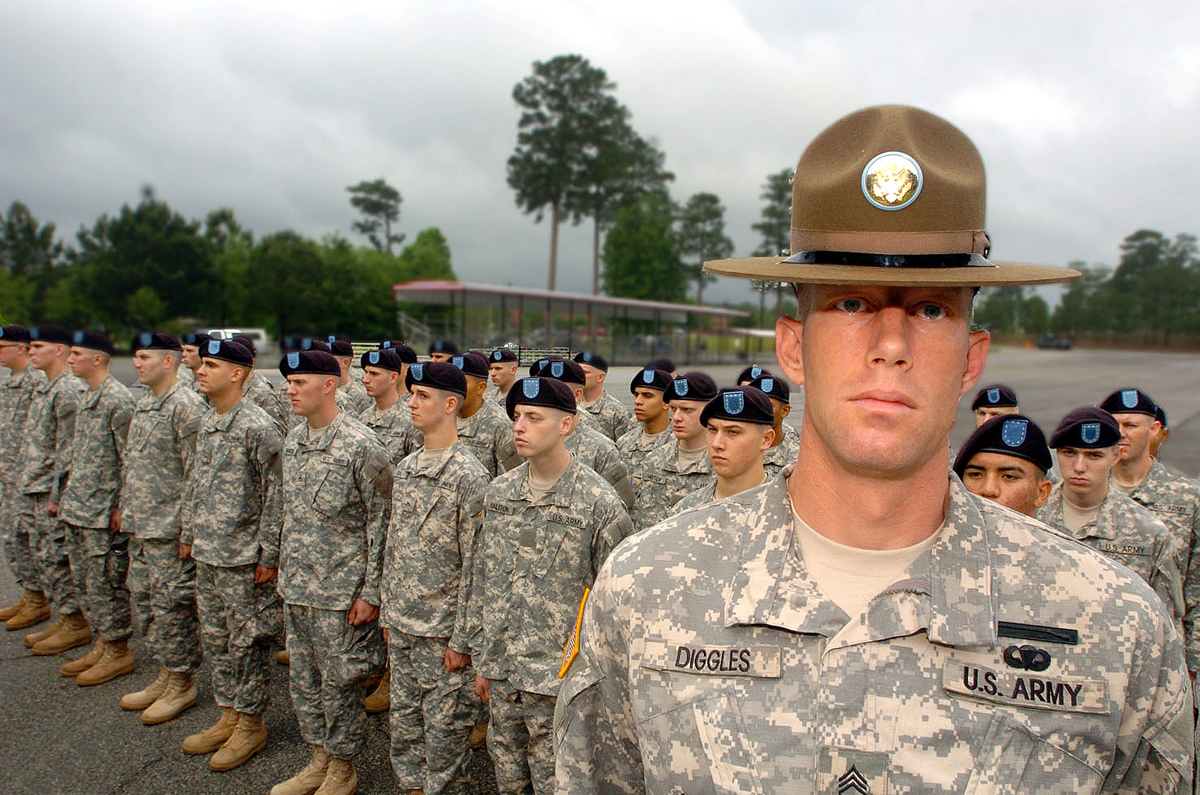
A U.S. Army drill sergeant standing before his company.

Drill sergeants are the instructors responsible for most of the recruit training that takes place during Initial Entry Training. They accompany recruits throughout the entire training process, instructing and correcting actions in everything from firing weapons to the correct way to address a superior, and are also largely responsible for the safety of recruits. They are recognizable by their distinctive headgear (campaign hats), often referred to as "brown rounds" or "Smokey Bear" hats, as they resemble that character's round park ranger-style hat.

=== Battle buddies ===
Battle buddies generally refer to partners in a combat scenario. However, throughout Basic Training the term is used to describe a disciplinary principle whereby recruits are prohibited from walking anywhere alone. When traveling away from the platoon or a drill sergeant, recruits are expected to travel in pairs, known as battle buddies. Battle buddies are sometimes assigned, or can be chosen by recruits when the need to travel arises.

=== Daily schedule ===
A typical day in Basic Training generally follows this schedule. Times can change depending on location, commanding officers, or when drill sergeants see a need for variation.

Time	Activity	Description
4:30 a.m.	First Call	Wake up to perform personal morning tasks and conduct hygiene. For males, shaving is mandatory every morning, with some exceptions for to accommodate religious beliefs.
5:00 a.m.	Physical Training (PT)	Form up in the company area, perform morning physical training (calisthenics and running).
6:00 a.m.	Breakfast	
6:30 a.m.	Training	Begin the day's scheduled training exercises.
12:00 p.m.	Lunch	
12:30 p.m.	Training	Continue the day's scheduled training exercises.
5:00 p.m.	Dinner	
5:30 p.m.	Drill sergeant time	Time for drill sergeants to speak with the recruits about any subject they may think requires attention. Mail call is also performed during this time.
8:00 p.m.	Personal time	Time for recruits to engage in personal activities, such as writing letters, laundry, showering, relaxation, or sleep. Recruits may also catch up on platoon duties during this time, such as barracks cleaning or wall locker organization.
9:00 p.m.	Lights-out	

=== Fire guard and charge of quarters ===
Every night, at least two recruits from the platoon must be awake at any given time. Duties include patrolling their barracks area, watching for fires, cleaning the barracks and watching for recruits attempting to leave the barracks area. They wake the next pair of recruits at the end of their one-hour shift. This duty is called fire guard or access control guard (ACG).

Fire guard stems back to the days of wooden barracks and wood-burning stoves. The fire guard would watch the stoves to make sure that the barracks would not catch fire. Since open flames are not generally used to heat sleeping areas any longer, present-day fire guard duty during Basic Training is more an exercise in discipline than a practical necessity, although if the weather gets cold enough, some groups conducting overnight outdoor training will still use a "pot bellied" stove which must be watched to prevent accidental fires. It is primarily used to ensure accountability of personnel and equipment during the night.

Charge of quarters, commonly called CQ, functions in a somewhat similar manner. CQ shifts rotate throughout the entire company, with just two recruits from the company staying awake per shift. The actual charge of quarters is the drill sergeant and the pair of recruits staying awake are the "runners", meaning that they perform tasks for the CQ. They perform some of the same duties as the fire guard shift. Only the CQ on duty is permitted to open the barracks doors and the runners must alert the CQ if someone else attempts to enter or leave the barracks.

=== Hands-on training ===
For many hands-on instructional sessions, recruits are transported to other locations on base that specialize in the given subject. For instance, a class on the use of hand grenades is given at a location where a range is already set up with the appropriate props for the simulation, including targets, fake grenades, identification stations, and a live grenades throwing bay. All trainees must throw two live hand grenades to graduate BCT.

=== Split training option ===
The Split Training Option (also known as STO or Split-Op) is an enlistment option available for Army National Guard and United States Army Reserve recruits. This program allows individuals to attend Basic Training during one summer, drill with their respective units once a month on weekends while attending school, and then within one year of completion of BCT, the Soldiers are ordered to AIT, Phase II of IET, and complete their required MOS training after graduation. This enlistment option is usually popular among high school students who wish to enlist as early as possible, while still attending school. The split option program is also available to seasonal workers, and college students.

== History ==
During the American Revolutionary War, the Continental Army trained while encamped. In 1778, Friedrich Wilhelm von Steuben initiated the first formalized training program. Following the war, the Army was largely disbanded in favor of militias. Following disastrous losses to Native Americans, however, the United States authorized the Legion of the United States. Led by Major General Anthony Wayne, the Legion constructed a training camp called Legionville near Pittsburgh. This is considered the Army's first basic training camp.

During the American Civil War, both the Union and Confederate armies relied on volunteer state units to quickly grow their armies. In contrast to the Regular federal units, state units fought in battles with little formal training.

The United States Army began a systematic, 16-week program to train individual Soldiers when it entered World War I in 1917. The Army established more than 30 training camps to prepare state troops and new recruits. Due to the urgent need to aid France, training was more focused on mobilization than combat training. Soldiers arrived quickly in France, but required additional training once they arrived, in order to make them combat ready. This highlighted the need for a standardized training regimen that would provide new Soldiers with rudimentary combat training.

The Army was greatly reduced after the Armistice of 11 November 1918, but World War II again created the need to train a large number of new Soldiers. Recruits and draftees first reported to Induction Centers, where they were administratively and medically processed into the Army. Following induction, new Soldiers were sent to specialized training which, for combat arms, meant basic training.

Following WWII, the Army retained an 8-week standardized basic training course, but advanced training was left to the responsibility of unit commanders. Colonel S.L.A. Marshall published a book in 1947 entitled Men Against Fire, which claimed that only 25% of Soldiers had fired their weapons in WWII due to strong social norms against killing. Although his findings were controversial, the Army adapted basic training to include attack exercises. Dedicated Drill Sergeants were added to basic training in 1964. In 1973, Basic Training came under control of the newly created United States Army Training and Doctrine Command.

== Locations ==
The recruit's entry location in the United States determines where the recruit will attend Basic Combat Training if the recruit chose a non-combat support MOS. A recruit that has chosen a particular combat MOS (Infantry, Military Police, Combat Engineer) will require specific OSUT. Advanced Individual Training depends on the Soldier's determined Military Occupational Specialty, or MOS, which is selected upon enlistment into the Army. For a non-combat support MOS, AIT will commence following successful completion of Basic Training. Soldiers requiring air transportation to their training locations are flown via commercial flight at the Army's expense.

=== One Station Unit Training ===
With some MOSs, both the BCT and AIT phases of training are accomplished back-to-back at the same location, with the same instructors, as well as with the same fellow recruits. This is called One Station Unit Training, or OSUT. For example, the Infantry MOS consists of BCT followed by 12 weeks of Infantry training, all within the same location. A similar program is followed for Combat Engineers and Bridge Crewmen, who train for 14 consecutive weeks, as well as Cavalry Scouts, Tank Crewmen, Field Artillery, and Military Police.

=== Basic Combat Training sites ===
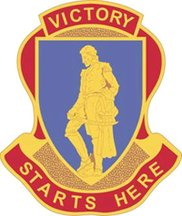
Fort Jackson BCT emblem.

The U.S. Army has four sites for BCT:

- Fort Benning near Columbus, Georgia; provides standard BCT as well as Infantry and Armor OSUT
- Fort Jackson near Columbia, South Carolina; non-combat MOS
- Fort Leonard Wood near St. Robert, Missouri; also provides Corps of Engineers OSUT and AIT, Chemical Corps AIT, and Military Police OSUT
- Fort Sill near Lawton, Oklahoma; also provides Artillery AIT

=== Advanced Individual Training ===
AIT is conducted at the corresponding school for the recruit's MOS (see Advanced Individual Training).

== Reception Battalion ==
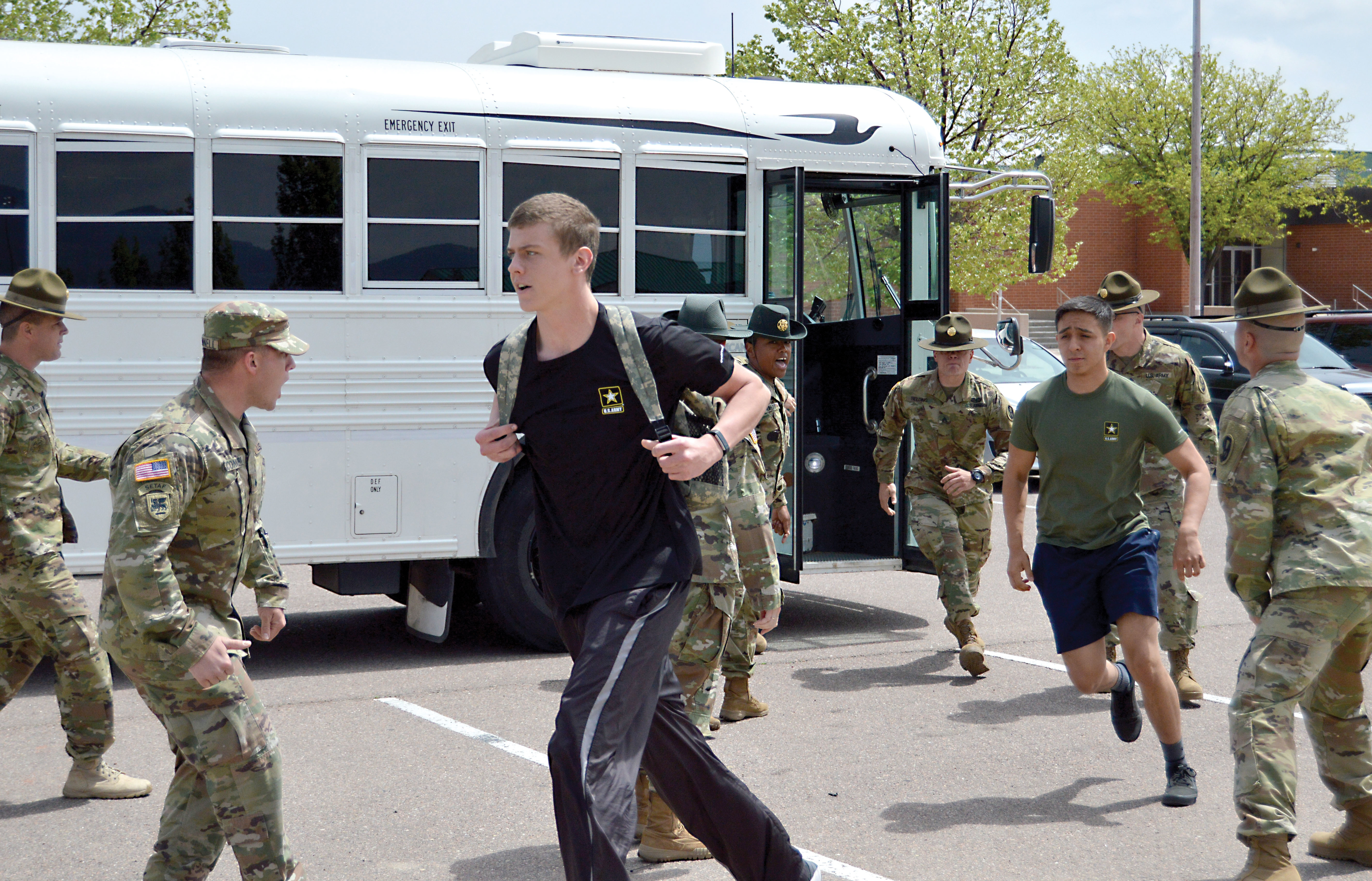
A simulated reception in the Army for prospective recruits.

Reception Battalion (RECBN) is the period that begins when the recruit arrives at the Army post where he or she is to undergo Basic Training. It typically lasts 4 to 10 days and is where initial preparations for training are performed, including:

- Haircut (buzz cut for men; women must either cut hair short or wear pinned up)
- Physical examination (including blood and urine tests)
- Inoculations
- Distribution of uniforms and gear, such as duffel bag and mouth guard
- Instruction in basic marching and standing, as well as general upkeep of barracks

=== Fitness Training Company ===
The recruits who fail the physical assessment test can be held back at Reception Battalion, where they are placed in Fitness Training Company (FTC), sometimes referred to in slang form as "Fat Camp." FTC involves daily, rigorous physical training and diet monitoring by Master Fitness Trainers (MFTs). Recruits in FTC are provided two chances each week to complete the physical assessment test and upon passing are allowed to move on to the next phase of Basic Training. Recruits who spend four weeks in FTC without passing the physical assessment test (failing the test eight times) might be discharged from the Army via an Entry Level Separation (see Discharge from Basic Training below).

The FTC currently is not in use. As there are no longer physical fitness standards to enter BCT, there is no standard to hold them to and the unit is no longer needed.

FTC is not to be confused with FTU, a place where recruits who sustain injuries during Basic Training may also be assigned for rehabilitation.

== Basic Combat Training ==
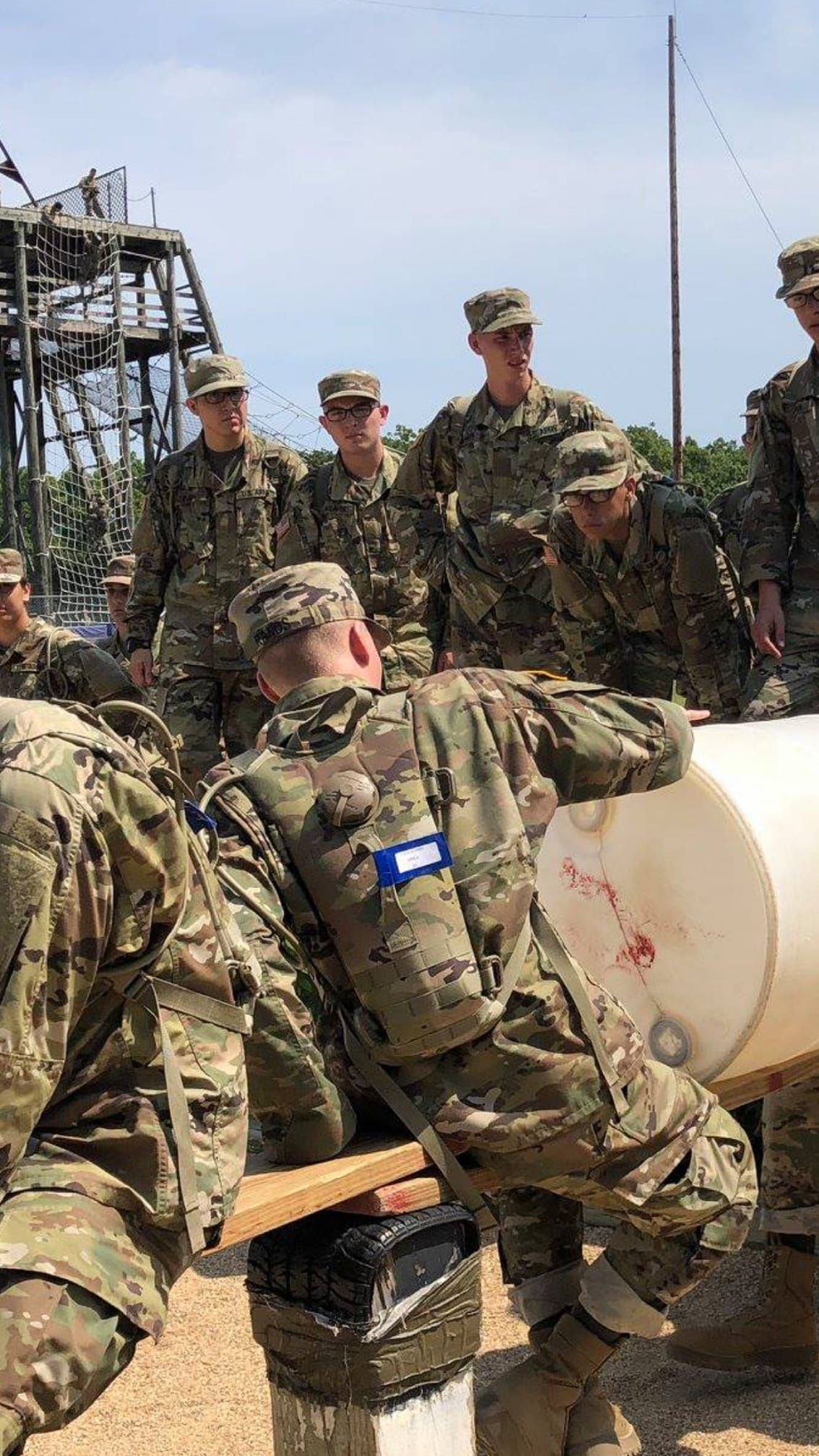
Trainees at Fort Leonard Wood attempting a teamwork challenge. (June 2018)

Basic Combat Training, or BCT, is a ten-week process which includes one week of reception. Reception Battalion is the first stop before meeting the drill sergeants and starting Basic Combat Training. Reception will typically last between 3–5 days and includes; physical exam, vaccinations, haircut, uniform and Army Physical Fitness Uniform. In most Reception Battalions the Army Fitness Test will be administered before starting Basic Training Day 1 training cycle that teaches identical skills for all MOSs (Military Occupational Specialties). This is because the Army believes that no matter the Soldier's specialty, they should all be taught the same basic procedures and skill set so they are ready to properly work together and defend themselves, as well as their fellow soldiers, if/when necessary.

BCT is divided into four phases, each represented by a color: yellow, red, white, and blue for Phase I, II, III, and IV respectively. BCT trainees are progressively allowed more responsibility, privileges, and independence each time they achieve a new phase of training. Whereas trainees in Phase I are constantly monitored and led around by their drill sergeants, Phase IV trainees are largely responsible for making sure tasks are completed correctly and on-time and keeping themselves on-schedule.

At some Basic Training stations, the current phase is denoted by the color of guidon carried by the platoon. Following the recruits' successful completion of the Field Training Exercise (a final, culminating exercise prior to graduation), the Phase IV blue guidon is sometimes traded for a tri-color red, white, and blue guidon that symbolizes successful completion of all three BCT phases.

=== Phase I ===
The First 100 Yards
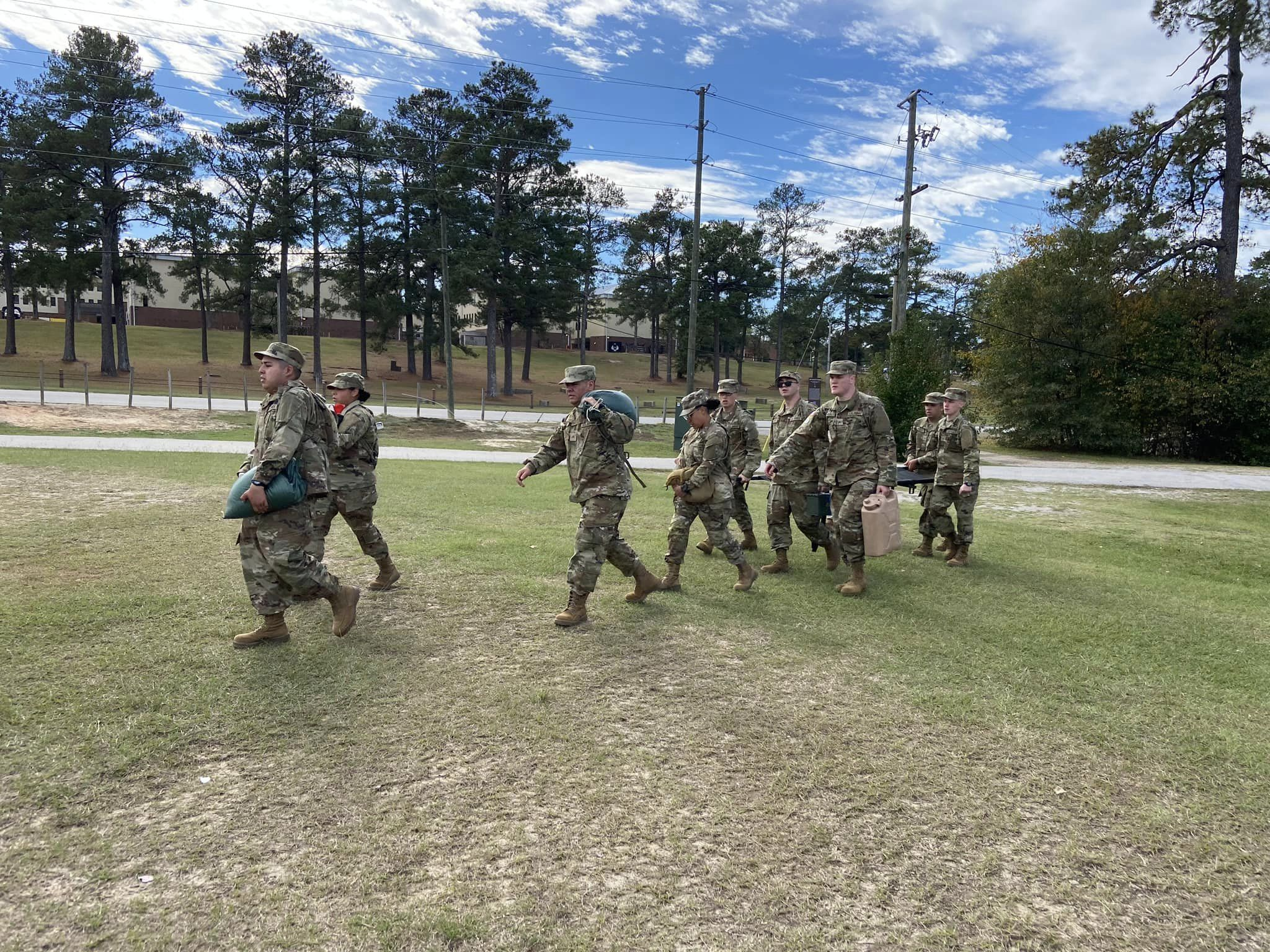
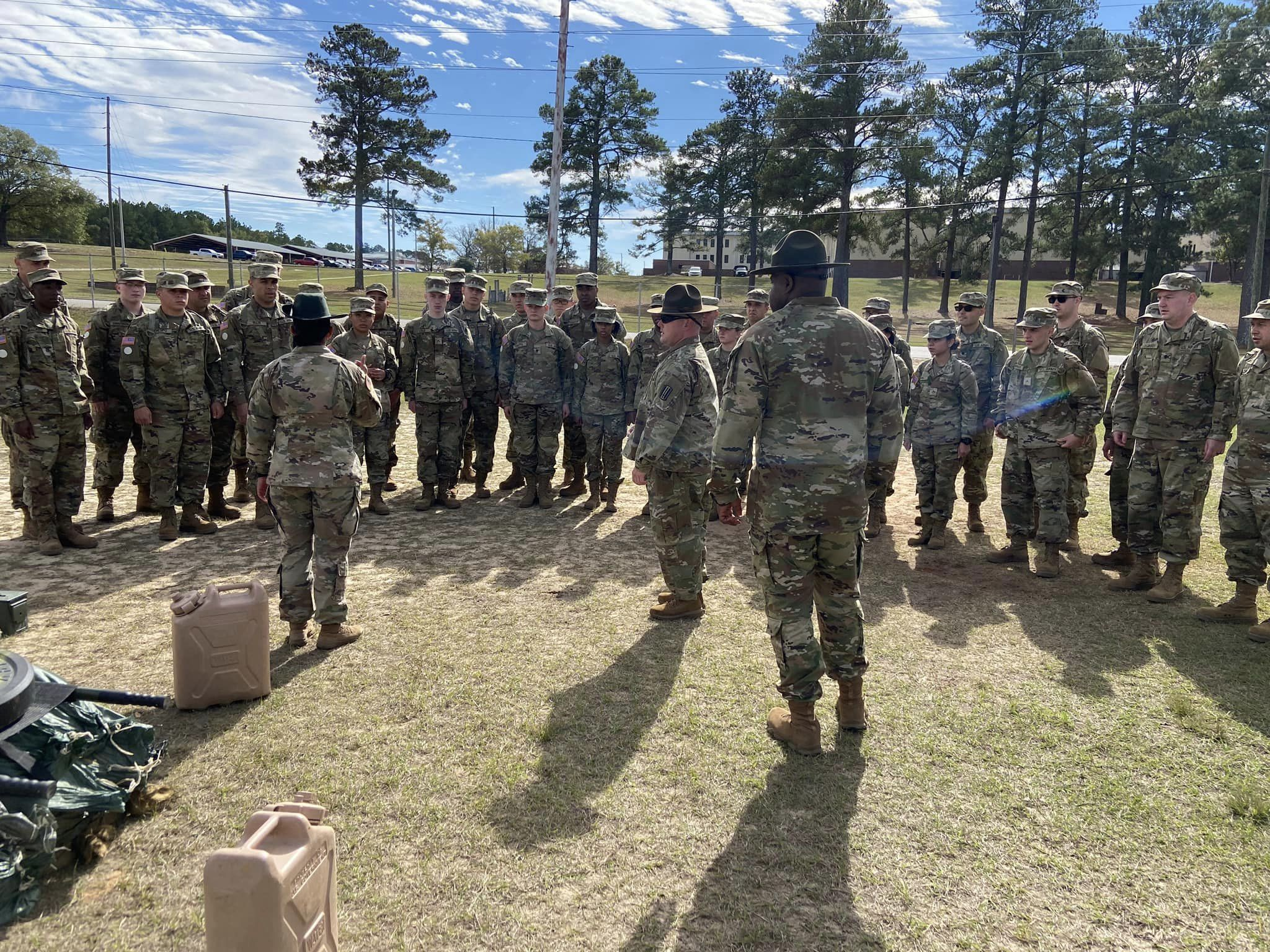
Newly arrived trainees in 2nd Platoon, D Company, 1st Battalion, 13th Infantry Regiment carry a simulated litter during the "First 100 yards" and are debriefed afterwards, November 2022.

The event “The First 100 Yards,” an homage to their lineage of closing the last 100 yards of the fight (succeeding the "shark attack"), incorporates teamwork into a competition that features mental and physical challenges on the day they arrive to their basic training company.

During Phase I or the "Red Phase," recruits are subject to "Total Control," meaning their every action is monitored and constantly corrected by drill sergeants. Recruits are often subjected to group corrective action for even minor infractions, the purpose being to develop an acute attention to detail and foster a sense of common responsibility among the unit.

==== Week 1 ====
Week 1 begins with the recruits meeting the drill sergeants who will be responsible for their training throughout BCT. The drill sergeants pick up their recruits from Reception Battalion and either transport or march them to their company area. The company area is the common area for the entire company (up to 240 recruits).

Upon arrival at the company area, recruits are divided into their platoons and begin the "First 100 Yards", where Trainees begin to build comradery amongst their platoon and learn the history of the U.S. Army. The "First 100 Yards" allows Trainees to begin building cohesive teams from the very beginning of their transformation from civilian into U.S. Army soldier.

Drill and ceremony training begins during week 1. This refers to correct procedures for marching and body movements such as standing at attention, "facing" (right-face/left-face), "at ease," "to the rear" and others. For this and many other exercises, soldiers are sometimes issued fake rifles known as "rubber ducks," so that they can become familiar with the proper handling and added weight of their weapon before they have actually been trained to use it. More recently, recruits have begun to be issued fully functional M16A2/A4s during the first week of BCT to allow for early familiarization with the weapon.

Classroom instructions are given in each of the seven "Army Core Values," which include loyalty, duty, respect, selfless service, honor, integrity and personal courage (meant to spell out the mnemonic LDRSHIP, or leadership). There are also classes held on subjects that involve day-to-day personal life in the Army, such as sexual harassment awareness/prevention and inter-ethnic relations.

==== Week 2 ====
Trainees of D Company, 1st Battalion, 13th Infantry Regiment rappelling down the Victory Tower, November 2022

During week 2, recruits begin unarmed combat training, also known as hand-to-hand combat, Combatives or Ground Fighting Technique (GFT). The training often culminates in a competition where each platoon chooses one recruit to compete, the platoons each choose one male and one female.

Recruits are also instructed in map reading, land navigation and compass use. These skills are put to the test at the compass course, where recruits are divided into groups and must navigate their way to a series of points throughout a wooded area.

Recruits will also tackle Victory Tower and the Teamwork Development Course during week 2. Victory Tower is an exercise where recruits must navigate through several obstacles at heights, including climbing and traversing rope ladders and bridges. They must then rappel down a 50-foot wall (back-first, with rope harness). In the Teamwork Development Course, squads must navigate a series of obstacles, with emphasis on working as a team rather than as individuals.

First aid training, known as Combat Life Saver (CLS), is also given during this period. Recruits are trained in evaluating and properly treating casualties, ranging from dressing a wound to application of a tourniquet and dehydration treatment.

==== Week 3 ====
D Company, 1st Battalion, 13th Infantry Regiment undergoing CBRN instruction, November 2022

Recruits begin training with methods for carrying an unconscious or immobile person and physical problem solving, such as finding a way to carry equipment from point A to point B given specific obstacles and constraints.

Recruits are also commonly sent to a gas chamber during this week, which is a large, sealed chamber where soldiers are subjected to CS gas while wearing their protective masks. The gas chamber is the culmination of a series of classroom instructions on gas mask use. Recruits are forced to unmask just before exiting the chamber so that they can briefly experience the effects of the gas. Drill sergeants will usually ask each recruit to recite information while they are unmasked, such as name, social security number or the Pledge of Allegiance, so that the recruit is forced to open their mouth/eyes and/or take a breath while demonstrating continued focus.

Week 3 is also when the recruits are introduced to their standard-issue weapon, the M4A1 carbine. This does not yet involve the actual firing of the rifle. It does include basic rifle marksmanship (BRM) fundamentals training (instruction in marksmanship techniques without firing the rifle. For instance, trigger control is practiced by placing a wooden dowel down the barrel of the rifle with a coin placed on the exposed end. If the recruit can pull the trigger without the coin falling from the dowel, their trigger control is satisfactory), as well as maintenance tasks, including "field stripping" (quickly disassembling, cleaning, and reassembling) the rifle. Many of these tasks are now done during Week 1 as a part of the initial round of classroom instruction.

=== Phase II ===
D Company, 1st Battalion, 13th Infantry Regiment conduct rifle marksmanship, December 2022.

Phase II, or the "White Phase", is where soldiers begin actually firing weapons. With the service rifle (M4A1 carbine), they will fire at various targets, which are progressively further downrange, making each successive target more difficult to hit, with additional pop-up targets at long range. Other weapons the soldier becomes familiar with include various hand grenades (such as the M67), grenade launchers (such as the M203) and machine guns (such as the M240, M249 and M2). The second week of Phase II involves familiarization with anti-tank/armor weaponry and other heavy weapons.

There is also an obstacle course which the soldiers are expected to negotiate within a certain time limit, known as the "confidence course", since the main objective is to build self-confidence. There is also the expectation of working as a team with the assigned battle buddy.

Additionally, there is continual, intense physical training as well as drill and ceremony training. At the conclusion of Phase II, soldiers are expected to demonstrate proficiency with the various weaponry in which they trained, using numerous "go or no-go" (pass/fail) exercises prior to being allowed to move on to Phase III.

=== Phase III ===
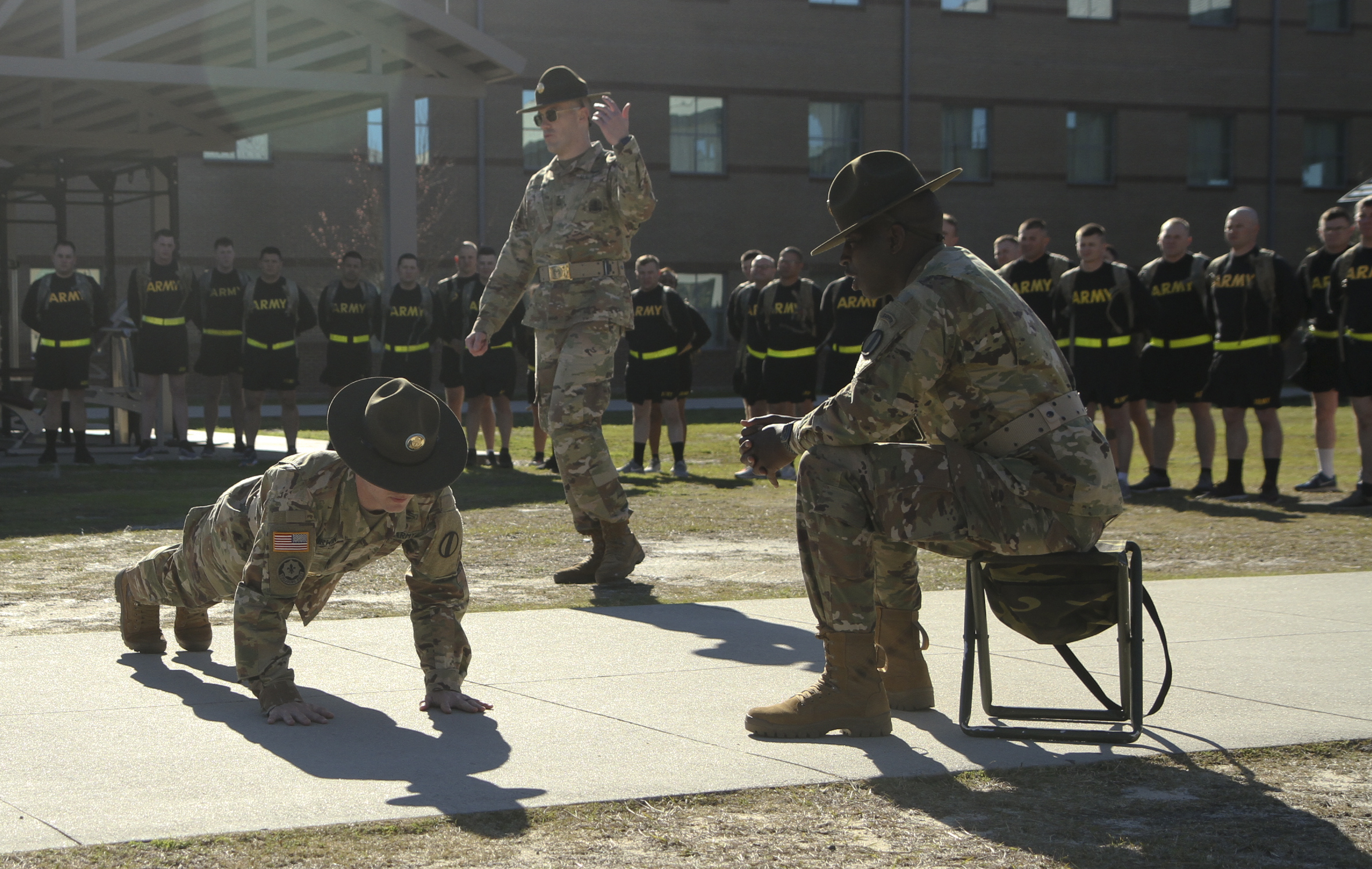
A demonstration of a proper push up exercise.

Phase III, or the "Blue Phase," is the culmination and possibly the most challenging of all the training phases. During this phase, an Army Combat Fitness Test is administered to determine whether the recruit has successfully met the requirements for graduation. Although not previously mentioned, an ACFT is given at a minimum at every phase of training, with a diagnostic ACFT given at Phase I. This is conducted to ensure that all recruits are meeting the standard along the way. Recruits failing to meet the standard of the ACFT will be locally retrained by their drill sergeants and a specialized fitness program is developed to focus on the recruits weaknesses while continuing to maintain and improve upon those events the recruit has successfully passed. When a recruit has successfully passed the ACFT, the recruit will have one of the critical benchmark requirements for graduation. At some locations, soldiers who fail are not allowed to go into the field with the rest of the platoon. The final ACFT Test consists of the Standard Army Annual ACFT Examination. A minimum of 360 points is required to pass U.S. Army Basic Training.

Those who pass will move on to "Bivouac" (camping) and FTX (Field Training Exercises), such as nighttime combat operations and MOUT (Military Operations in Urban Terrain) training. There is no access to the dining facility during these exercises, so meals are given in the form of either MREs (Meal Ready to Eat) or field chow. Drill sergeants will make much of this an adversarial process, working against the recruits in many of the night operations by trying to foil plans, et cetera. Other BCT companies also in their FTX weeks may join in simulated combat scenarios, generally at night, with intense competition to prove their particular company the better trained.

Week 2 of Phase III (the 8th week of Basic Training) culminates in a special tactical FTX during which the drill sergeants will advise, but allow recruit platoon leaders and squad leaders to exercise primary decision-making. They attempt to make virtually every one of these exercises different. Because being a soldier is potentially an extremely hazardous job, recruits must demonstrate extreme aggression and fearlessness, tempered by intelligence and common sense. Only those that demonstrate these vital attributes will be permitted to move on to AIT (Advanced Individual Training).

Following their FTX, recruits then move into the final week of training, often called "recovery week," At this time, soldiers must service and/or repair any items they are not taking on to AIT including weapons, bedding, issued equipment (helmet, canteen, gas mask, et cetera) as well as ensuring the platoon barracks is in good order to receive the next platoon of trainees. This week also includes a final fitting of the recruit's dress uniform as well as practice for the graduation ceremony, which takes place at the end of the cycle.

Upon completion of Basic Combat Training trainees earn the title of soldier.

== Advanced Individual Training ==
Advanced Individual Training, or AIT, is where new soldiers receive specific training in their chosen MOS. The length of AIT training varies depending on the MOS and can last anywhere from four weeks to nearly a year.

Just like in BCT, AIT progressively allows trainees more privileges and independence. Trainees begin AIT in Phase IV. After a varying length of time and satisfactory performance, trainees are awarded Phase V. Phase V often includes the privilege of applying for off-post passes or use of electronic devices. Phase V+ is awarded after a set length of time and continued good conduct. Phase V+ trainees may walk about the base without having a battle buddy present, be able to drink alcohol on weekends (provided one is of legal drinking age) and even stay off-post overnight on weekends. These privileges vary.

Graduates of AIT are automatically enrolled in structured self-development, which is an online program that feeds into the basic leader course (BLC). BLC is the first course of the NCO professional development program.

=== Advanced Individual Training schools ===
AIT schools include (not a complete list):

- Adjutant General School at Fort Jackson, Columbia, South Carolina
- Air Defense Artillery School at Fort Sill, Lawton, Oklahoma
- Medical Department Center and School at Fort Sam Houston, San Antonio, Texas
- Armor School at Fort Benning, Columbus, Georgia
- Aviation School at Fort Rucker, Daleville, Alabama
- United States Army Aviation Logistics School at Fort Eustis, Newport News, Virginia
- Army Chaplain Center and School at Fort Jackson, Columbia, South Carolina
- CBRN School at Fort Leonard Wood, St. Robert, Missouri
- Engineer School at Fort Leonard Wood, St. Robert, Missouri
- Field Artillery School at Fort Sill, Lawton, Oklahoma
- Financial Management School at Fort Jackson, Columbia, South Carolina
- Infantry School at Fort Benning, Columbus, Georgia
- Intelligence Center at Fort Huachuca, Sierra Vista, Arizona
- Special Warfare Center and School at Fort Bragg, Fayetteville, North Carolina
- Military Police School at Fort Leonard Wood, St. Robert, Missouri
- Ordnance Training and Heritage Center at Fort Gregg-Adams, Petersburg, Virginia.
- Quartermaster School at Fort Gregg-Adams, Petersburg, Virginia
- Signal School at Fort Gordon, Augusta, Georgia
- Transportation School at Fort Gregg-Adams, Petersburg, Virginia, with some courses conducted at Fort Eustis and Fort Leonard Wood

== Discharge from Basic Training ==
A recruit can be discharged from the Army before the conclusion of Basic Training. Discharges that occur before the completion of 180 days (six months) of training are considered uncharacterized, which are neither honorable nor less than honorable.

- An Entry Level Separation (ELS) can occur when a recruit demonstrates unsatisfactory performance and/or misconduct. A recruit can only be ELSed after at least four weeks of training and two counseling sessions, except under extreme circumstances, such as a recruit deemed suicidal.
- If it is found that a recruit is unable to train due to a chronic medical condition, he or she may obtain a medical discharge by the recommendation of an Army medical doctor.
- A discharge due to any condition Existing Prior To Service (EPTS) may occur when a recruit is found to have a prior medical condition existing before enlistment. A recruit may receive a rare honorable discharge for an EPTS condition if they have been in Basic Training for more than 180 days.

== See also ==
- Basic Training – Initial Military Training
- Recruit training
- Recruit Training Command, Great Lakes, Illinois
- United States Air Force Basic Military Training
- United States Coast Guard Training Center Cape May, New Jersey
- United States Marine Corps Recruit Training
- United States Army Airborne School
- Ranger Assessment and Selection Program
- United States Army Special Forces selection and training
