= Buddy system =

Procedure in which two people operate together as a single unit

The buddy system is a procedure in which two individuals, the "buddies", operate together as a single unit so that they are able to monitor and help each other. As per Merriam-Webster, the first known use of the phrase "buddy system" goes back to 1942. Webster goes on to define the buddy system as "an arrangement in which two individuals are paired (as for mutual safety in a hazardous situation).”

== Advantages ==
In adventurous or dangerous activities, where buddies are often required, the main benefit of the system is improved safety; each may be able to prevent the other from becoming a casualty or rescue the other in a crisis.

When this system is used as part of training or the induction of newcomers to an organization, the less experienced buddy learns more quickly from close and frequent contact with the experienced buddy than when operating alone.

== Disadvantages ==
The buddy system can produce an unrealistic sense of security. Some hazards can overwhelm two people at the same time, and since there tends to be an assumption that this will not happen, it can cause delays in necessary response. The buddies may also become complacent, each assuming that the other is more alert, aware, and careful than they actually are. A further factor is that the system can be very inefficient, requiring the presence of a second person on jobs where one would be adequate.

== Organizations ==
The buddy system is used in the United States Armed Forces, and referred to by various names in each branch ("Wingmen" in the Air Force, "Battle Buddies" in the Army, "Shipmates" in the Navy), as well as the Boy Scouts of America and the Girl Scouts of the USA.

It is also used by religious organizations like the LDS Church. Members on the mission form a companionship constituted by two or sometimes more missionaries, which are not allowed to be alone for two years: "Stay Together. Never be alone. You must stay with your companion at all times."

The buddy system is used in new employee induction for assisting with the formalities in an organization. The period could be from a month to two months. The buddy helps in acclimatizing the new employee to the culture and day-to-day aspects of working, in a shorter period. The buddy helps the new employee to become knowledgeable about department practices and organizational culture in a shorter period. The purpose of assigning new employees with a buddy is to help welcome employees and reaffirms their decision to join the organization. It provides new employees with a reliable, motivated, single point of contact for their basic questions regarding their work experience. The buddy system is an effective method to provide support, monitor stress, and reinforce safety procedures.

The buddy system is also informally used by school-aged children, especially on field trips. Assigning each student a buddy provides an extra measure of safety and removes some of the burdens of keeping an eye on a large number of children in an unfamiliar environment from the supervising adults.

The buddy system encourages open and effective dialogue among peers and tends to break down social barriers with their classmates. It helps create a collaborative learning environment in which peers feel less hesitant to raise questions. This enables students to develop social networks and cross-cultural experiences. It provides effective support for the students who are at risk and lowers the attrition rate at the higher education level.

== Education ==
=== Benefits of a buddy system ===
A buddy system in a school is where a child gets paired with another child, usually one that is older and of higher abilities. A buddy system helps to promote friendship, better support of coursework, behavioral and social needs, and can foster a greater sense of belonging and a more inclusive school community. Students create friendships that enable both older and younger "buddies" to bond more closely with their school, increasing the likelihood of more positive school behavior and positive response towards learning for all students. The buddy system helps students starting at a new school have a welcoming experience from the very beginning. The older children learn to take on responsibility, while the younger children know that they have a fellow student they can confidently turn to for support.

Buddy systems in schools can have numerous benefits such as promoting an inclusive environment for all, better acceptance of differences, promoting better self-control, expansion of communicative interaction with peers, decrease in behavioral problems, and even personal maturation or growth in career aspirations.

The buddy system can affect the culture of the school, the student, and the older buddy. Students may learn and share from their peers and learn collaboratively. Students may actively participate with each other in an informal setting and feel comfortable discussing with peers rather than a teacher. The opportunity for active participation, clearing doubts and discussions may help students to continue with studies or activities and creates a depth in the subject matter. The buddy system may help to increase self-confidence for all involved in the system and in the process helps build trust and co-operation within individuals. It can benefit the buddies, the buddy learner, the school/university and the parents. The buddies involved may also learn leadership skills and in turn can take up the role of buddy leader.

The buddy system helps in reducing the stress level of the learner. It reduces the levels of anxiety experienced by the students who struggle to engage with course material or with the school/university in general. "When there's a companion available, the physiological measure of stress—cortisol levels in the blood—can be alleviated somewhat", explains Jim Winslow, PhD, a specialist in behavioral neuroscience and pharmacology and head of the National Institute of Mental Health (NIMH) Intramural Research Program, Non-Human Primate Core.

Teachers at progressive schools collaborate to improve their students' learning—and their own. It gives independence to all students, and increases self-esteem and peer acceptance. Children become protectors of each other.

Christine Hogan states that the buddy system approach is highly appropriate for organizational behavior studies adding to the students' range of learning strategies. The technique not only works with peers of the same nation but has also proved to be of particular importance to foreign students.

=== Pairing types ===
There are numerous pairings styles: newly admitted students paired with older students, low achieving elementary school students paired with high achieving elementary school students; behaviorally challenged teenagers paired with adults; autistic children paired with non autistic children; severely disabled children paired with able-bodied children; and even college students paired with post-bachelor students.

=== Metropolitan Nashville Peer Buddy Program ===
An example of a successful peer buddy system was in Nashville, Tennessee's McGavock High School. Teachers were concerned with having a more inclusive environment for special education students. Not only were the specialized students excluded academically but there was social exclusion as well. This adversely affects specialized students when there is a need for them to later assimilate when out of high school. Students with disabilities were eating with their buddies and their friends, which resulted in the expansion of their circle of friendship and thus allowed for the special needs students to feel more normal and included. The program was so successful it was later adopted in the other 11 high schools of that district.

=== Buddy systems for mainstream students ===
There are more examples of buddy systems for developmentally challenged students than there are of students with normal development but with behavioral or academic needs. If a system can be implemented that can help autistic or behaviorally challenged children or children with intellectual disabilities, than similar buddy systems can be incorporated into mainstream classrooms to help aid students that have a hard time learning but who may not qualify for the special needs programs. Students with disabilities report feeling more included, able to start friendships and conversations, and these same benefits can be transferred over to students that have social problems but are not able to be in special needs programs. Similarly, a student who is struggling academically can be paired with someone more adept with certain subjects.

=== Implementation of buddy systems ===
Students that qualify for special needs services receive a lot of attention. For the students that do not qualify but might be struggling behaviorally and socially, then programs like these could potentially have similar benefits for them as well. Carolyn Hughes and Erik Carter promote a more ubiquitous peer buddy system in their book by laying out different strategies and benefits if schools were to include these systems in their curriculum. Examples they provide are: administrators assisting in the publication of the program, school counselors signing up students for a credit based buddy system course, general education teachers providing support for special needs students who might be in their classroom and having parents providing impetus and support for a program to begin. Carolyn Hughes and Erik Carter suggest starting on a smaller scale, perhaps a classroom or two and then growing a base of support.

=== Peer-to-peer buddy systems for students with autism ===
A key element of education is to build empathy and understand other people in the society. This approach sees a small group of students in a class being made "buddies" for an autistic student. The students are made aware of particular challenge a student has and are asked to take special care to include them, to be on the lookout for any bullying or exclusion and to be supportive to the student if they get stressed out or upset at break time or in class. The students who are selected would be chosen for their maturity and kindness. Parental consent would be sought from the parents of the students involved. While not every autistic student will instantly begin to socialise or make friends, this approach will at the very least ensure inclusion and also that there will be a friendly pair of eyes when teachers are not present or are out of ear-shot. For instance – maybe a student is having a bad day, is upset about something or just is not very good at starting conversations or making friends alone. Under this system, a class would explore difference as a whole and recognize that everyone in a class is different and so have different needs, strengths, abilities and oddities. They would then either be paired up or each student would draw a name and become "buddy" to that person, perhaps without them even being made aware of it. Before the draw or pairing it could be discussed with the teacher, to ensure an autistic student gets an especially strong buddy. The advantage of this system is that it does not single out the autistic student, especially if they are not comfortable with that, and instead includes everyone. Additionally, it gives the autistic person a role in being a buddy too, which can be used to teach social skills, expectations and etiquette.

=== Controversy in China ===
In Shandong University, the buddy system aims to help International students, and help Chinese students broaden their horizons.

However, the gender ratio of the student system has caused controversy in mainland China. The first batch of buddies' gender ratio is 1 to 1, but in 2018 the third batch changed to "141 Chinese students and 47 international students form 47 friendly 'buddies' groups". The number of foreign students and local students has reached an astonishing 1:3, and the number of students enrolled in the school is overwhelming. The move caused a heated discussion among netizens on Weibo. Many netizens believed that this move proved that Shanda's "Chongyang Meiwai" is essentially a "pimping strip".

== See also ==
- Battle buddy – U.S. Army term for a soldier's assigned partner
- Buddy diving – Practice of mutual monitoring and assistance between two divers
- Mountain marathon – Variant of fell running
- Two-person rule – Action only authorized by two or more people
