= Air and Space Longevity Service Award =

Military award of the United States Air Force and United States Space Force

- Air and Space Longevity Service Award
- Type: Ribbon
- Awarded for: Four years of creditable service
- Presented by: the Department of the Air Force
- Eligibility: Members of the United States Air Force and United States Space Force
- Status: Currently awarded
- Established: 25 November 1957

Precedence
- Next (higher): Air and Space Expeditionary Service Ribbon
- Next (lower): Developmental Special Duty Ribbon

The Air and Space Longevity Service Award (ASLSA) is a military award of the United States Air Force and United States Space Force established as the Air Force Longevity Service Award by Air Force General Order 60, on 25 November 1957 by General Thomas D. White, Air Force Chief of Staff. The award was primarily created as an air force equivalent to the service stripes used by other branches of the United States military to denote years of military service. The award is retroactive to the establishment of the U.S. Air Force as an independent service in September 1947. The ribbon is also retroactive for any service with the U.S. Army Air Forces, U.S. Army Air Corps, or U.S. Army Air Service prior to the creation of the U.S. Air Force as a separate service as long as the serviceman was on active duty on or after 18 September 1947. On 16 November 2020, the Air Force Longevity Service Award was renamed to the Air and Space Longevity Service Award by the Secretary of the Air Force.

== Criteria ==
The Air and Space Longevity Service Award is awarded for completing four years of Active, Air Force Reserve, or Air National Guard service. For members of the Air Force Reserve and Air National Guard, creditable service must have been in a drilling status with regular attendance of at least minimum monthly weekend drills and annual training. Air Force Reserve and Air National Guard mobilized to full-time active duty continue to accrue eligibility in the same manner as active duty Air Force personnel. Service as a student at a United States service academy, typically the USAF Academy, is also creditable so long as the member graduated. The ribbon is awarded to both officers and enlisted personnel, in contrast to service stripes which are only provided to enlisted members of the military.

== Appearance ==
The Air and Space Longevity Service Award is a ribbon-only award. It is ultramarine blue divided by four equal stripes of grotto blue. Oak leaf clusters are worn on the ribbon to indicate subsequent awards of the Air Force Longevity Service Award.

== See also ==
- Air Force Good Conduct Medal
