= Drill instructor =

Military training officer

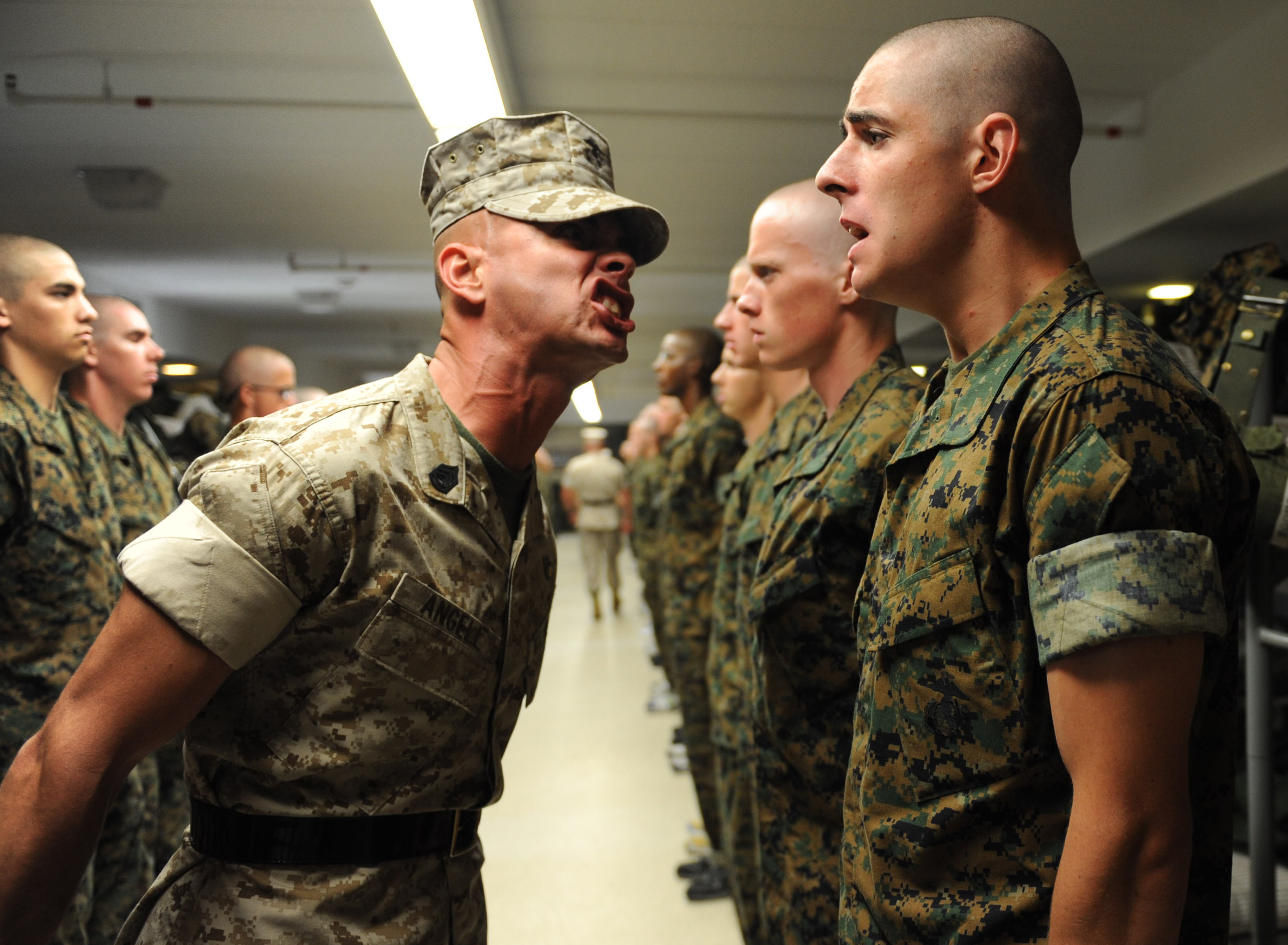
A Gunnery Sergeant Instructor at U.S. Marine Corps Officer Candidate School performing his duties

A drill instructor is a non-commissioned officer in the armed forces, fire department, or police forces with specific duties that vary by country. Foot drill, military step, and marching are typically taught by drill instructors.

== Australia ==
=== Australian Army ===
In the Australian Army, the staff responsible for training recruits are known as recruit instructors. They teach recruits discipline, fieldcraft, marksmanship, service knowledge and drill.

Each recruit platoon is commanded by recruit instructors, usually consisting of a lieutenant, a sergeant, and up to four instructors of the corporal or bombardier rank. A recruit instructor can be identified by a 1st Recruit Training Battalion colour patch on their slouch hat and a small Recruit Instructor badge worn on the right breast pocket, if the position has been held long enough.

Members from all Corps in the Army are eligible to become recruit instructors, including females. Experience as a recruit instructor is often a prerequisite to senior non-commissioned appointments in the military.

=== Royal Australian Navy ===
In the Royal Australian Navy, there are instructors at HMAS Cerberus, where the Recruit School course is held, and HMAS Creswell, where the NEOC (New Entry Officer Course) is held, as well as at ADFA.

Each division is made up of one of the following:

- Divisional officer (a lieutenant)
- Divisional chief petty officer
- Divisional petty officer
- Divisional junior sailor (a leading seaman, who is the class instructor)
- Divisional able seaman (some large divisions may have a few able seamen serving as assistant instructors)

=== Australian Federal Police ===
In the Australian Federal Police, drill instructors are trained and accredited by the Recognition and Ceremonial team. Each accredited drill instructor wears an AFP pin with the wording "DI" positioned 5 mm above their name plate or citations. Drill instructors are also issued with a black coloured Hellweg brand leather basket weave Sam Browne belt and strap. The AFP is the only police agency to formally train and accredit police drill instructors in Australia, with a number of New South Wales Police Force members attached to the NSW Police College holding that qualification.

The Australian Federal Police College at Barton has a non-commissioned officer of sergeant rank holding the position of college sergeant. The college sergeant carries a black pace stick as a badge of office at ceremonial functions and a swagger stick during normal duties.

=== New South Wales Police Force ===
The New South Wales Police Force has a drill sergeant and a drill constable attached to the NSW Police College at Goulburn. Drill staff are responsible for training recruits in drill. These personnel wear a blue cord to signify being a protocol officer. The senior protocol officer (formally known as protocol and discipline officer), which carries the rank of senior sergeant, is responsible for the coordination of the final week of drill, known as Attestation Week and holds the position of parade sergeant at all Attestation Parades. The senior protocol officer is responsible for dress, bearing and discipline and also is the guardian of NSWPF history, customs, traditions and symbols at the NSW Police College. The senior protocol officer carries a black pace stick with silver fittings and wears a black-coloured Hellweg Brand Sam Browne belt with strap as a badge of office.

=== Western Australia Police ===
The Western Australian Police Force has a drill sergeant of the rank of sergeant who trains recruits in drill, discipline and other matters. He is also the recruit training manager responsible for overseeing the recruits training, ceremonial graduations, police funerals and other events. He meets regularly with academy executive and is responsible for removing recruits who fail parts of the course. The sergeant carries a pace stick as a badge of office during parades.

== United Kingdom ==
=== British Army ===
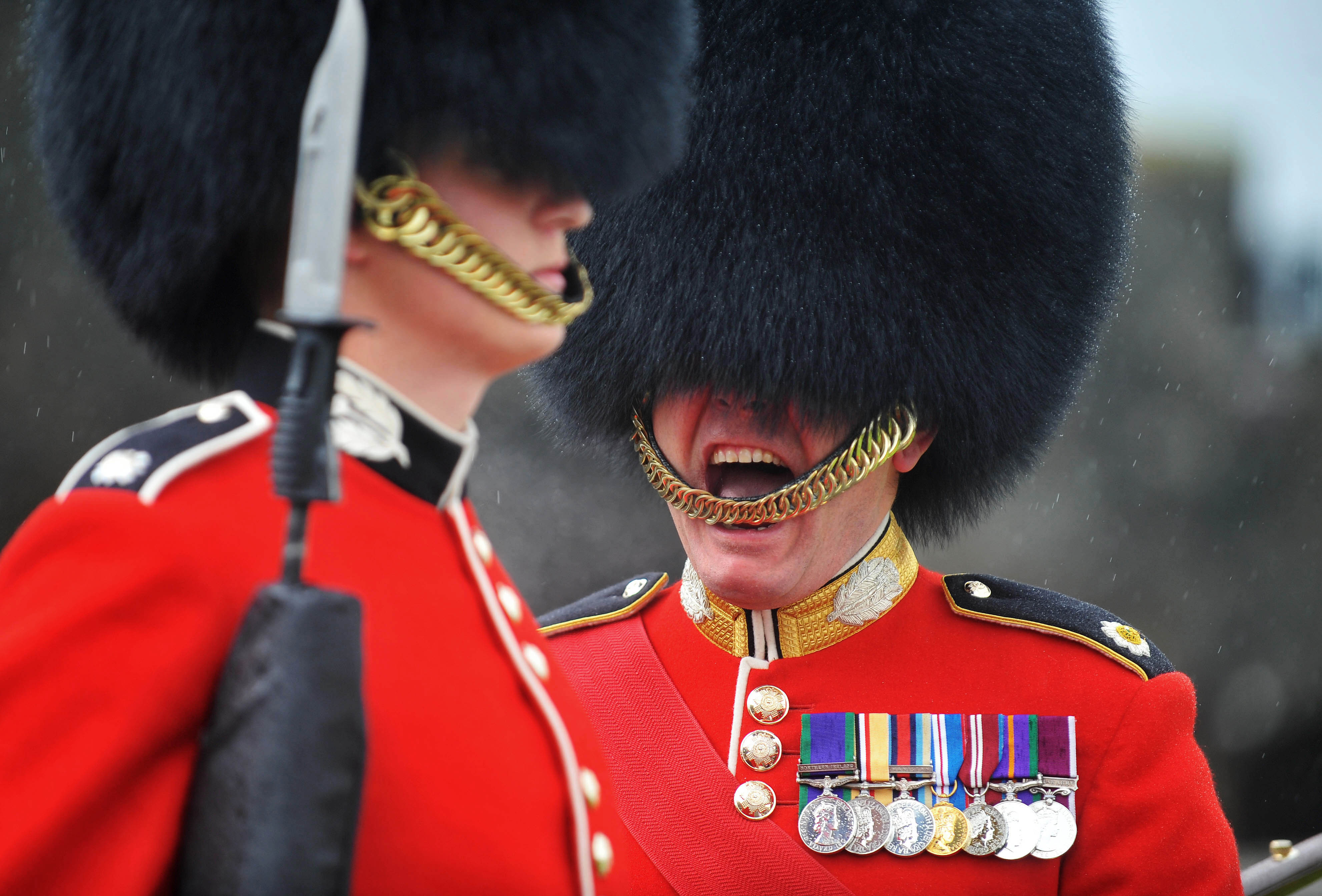
A drill sergeant of the Scots Guards shouting orders to his troops

In the British Army, the appointment of drill sergeant (DSgt) is limited to the five Foot Guards regiments, the Honourable Artillery Company (HAC), Infantry Training Centre Catterick, London District, and the All-Arms Drill Wing (part of the Army School of Ceremonial, Catterick). Drill sergeants hold the rank of Warrant Officer Class 2. However, any senior NCO conducting drill can be colloquially referred to as a "drill sergeant".

There are two drill sergeants per battalion (one in the HAC) and they have specific responsibilities for all duties, public or battalion (royal duties, barrack duties etc.). They support the garrison sergeant major (GSM) or regimental sergeant major (RSM) in the formation, practice and execution of these duties, typically running the duties roster, supervising rehearsals, and undertaking the guard mounts, both royal and barrack. They also deputise for the RSM in disciplinary matters.

The London District drill sergeant supports the GSM in the supervision of Trooping the Colour, the State Opening of Parliament, Beating the Retreat and any state visits. He also has responsibility under the GSM for the definition of British Army foot and arms drill.

They can be distinguished from other WO2s by their dress. They have the right to wear Sam Browne belts when in No.2 dress and carry swords (never drawn) on ceremonial duties.

They are the third most senior Warrant Officers within a regimental structure, after the RSM and the regimental quartermaster sergeant (RQMS). The HAC drill sergeant is thus the second most senior Army Reserve soldier in the regiment.

== United States ==
Drill instructors in the United States armed forces have different titles in each branch of service. In the United States Air Force, they are known as "Military Training Instructors", or MTIs. The United States Navy uses Marine Corps drill instructors at their Officer Candidate School, but only chief petty officers and petty officers (1st or 2nd Class) are called "recruit division commanders", or RDCs at their recruit training. Within the United States Army, drill instructors are given the title of "Drill Sergeant". The United States Coast Guard gives the title of "Company Commander" to their drill instructors. The United States Marine Corps is the only branch of the U.S. armed forces where drill instructors are titled as "Drill Instructors"; the Marines were the first to call them drill sergeants, but in 1971 changed to "instructors". Drill instructors are referred to as "sir" or "ma'am" by recruits within the USAF, USMC, and USCG (for the first few weeks of basic training, until recruits are instructed to refer to their company commanders by their proper rank). Within the USN, recruits must refer to their RDCs by their proper ranks. Recruits in the United States Army must refer to their drill sergeants as "drill sergeant".

The instruction and indoctrination given by the drill instructors of the various U.S. military branches includes instruction in customs and practices of military life, physical fitness, instruction in the proper execution of military drill, instilling discipline and willingness to immediately obey all lawful orders given by superiors, and oftentimes, basic armed and unarmed combat training.

Drill instructors are held responsible for the welfare, behavior, and military education of the recruits assigned to them on a 24-hour basis throughout the period of initial training, of which the most well known is Basic Training or boot camp. Their responsibilities include areas such as military discipline, physical fitness, and weapons training. The title of drill instructor is a billet independent of rank, to be held by non-commissioned officers who successfully complete the intense training program to earn that title.

The rank held by drill instructors varies by branch:

- Drill Sergeants in the United States Army are Sergeants (E-5), Staff Sergeants (E-6), and Sergeants First Class (E-7). Upon promotion to Master Sergeant (E-8), Drill Sergeants are "de-hatted" and removed from drill duty.
- Drill instructors in the United States Marine Corps hold ranks from sergeant (E-5) through gunnery sergeant (E-7). Per Marine Corps Orders 1326.6 (2019), "Mature and otherwise qualified Corporals may be assigned, with an approved exception to policy."
- Recruit division commanders (formerly Company Commanders) in the United States Navy are petty officer second class (E-5) through master chief petty officer (E-9).
- Military training instructors in the United States Air Force are generally staff sergeants with 2 years time in grade (E-5) through master sergeants (E-7).
- Company commanders in the United States Coast Guard are petty officer second class (E-5) through master chief petty officer (E-9).

The arduous nature of drill instructor duty means that such assignments are among the most prestigious carried out by enlisted personnel. Those who become drill instructors are eligible for a variety of military awards, such as the Marine Drill Instructor Ribbon, and the Army's Drill Sergeant Identification Badge.

=== U.S. Air Force ===
Air Force MTIs are non-commissioned officers ranging from staff sergeant (E-5) through master sergeant (E-7). They are trained at the Military Training Instructor School at Lackland AFB in San Antonio, Texas. Course length has changed several times during the last decade, but generally includes a period of assignment to a senior instructor to observe training (called "bird-dogging"). MTIs initially conduct basic training at Lackland Air Force Base as part of the 737th Training Group, but a select few conduct military training at the Officer Training School at Maxwell AFB and at the Air Force Academy during basic cadet training.

Male MTIs are identified by the dark blue campaign hat and female MTIs by the dark blue Australian bush hat. Their usual duty uniform is the Operational Camouflage Pattern (OCP), with blue service uniforms worn during certain drill practices and the graduation ceremony. Upon receiving their certification as an instructor, they receive the Air Education and Training Command Instructor badge for wear on the right side of the blue uniform.

MTIs usually begin their tours as "team members" - junior partners of a two-person team. Experienced MTIs becomes "team chiefs" and often work a basic training flight alone when manning shortages occur (especially during summer). MTIs refer to direct recruit training as being "on the street". At the conclusion of a tour, some MTIs are offered the chance to work in essential support training roles in the basic training course. This includes the combat training portions of the course, classroom academic instruction, and the "confidence" obstacle course.

Unlike the Army, the Air Force uses a different specialist to continue military training during advanced individual or technical training. Military training leaders (MTLs) wear a blue aiguillette on the left shoulder and act in the same capacity as Army drill sergeants during technical training. The aiguillette in various colors is worn by students to indicate leadership roles - green for student flight leaders, yellow for student squadron leaders, and red for squadron student commanders. A white aiguillette is worn by chapel guides, a white and blue rope denotes they are in the Drum and Bugle Corps, and a teal rope is worn by student counselors. At some technical training centers a black aiguillette is worn by members of student honor guards or drill teams.

=== U.S. Army ===
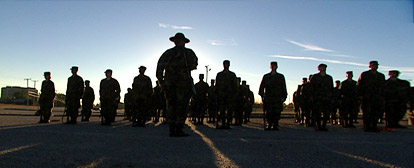
A drill sergeant drills trainees in the U.S. Army.

Historically, the task of the drill sergeant has been intrinsic to good order and discipline and commands respect throughout the Army. Currently, soldiers of appropriate rank (usually staff sergeants and sergeants first class) may volunteer or be centrally selected by U.S. Army Human Resources Command to attend the Drill Sergeant Academy. Those centrally selected are known as "DA Selected" meaning Department of the Army selected. Drill Sergeant School is nine weeks long and consists of mostly the same activities as basic training; drill and ceremony, basic rifle marksmanship, obstacle/confidence courses, field training exercises, training management, and leadership. Certain aspects of the Basic Leader Course are included. Drill Sergeant Candidates are held to the highest standards while going through the school as preparation for their tours of duty. The Drill Sergeant Candidates are treated with a great deal of professionalism and not like recruits. Upon graduation, male drill sergeants wear the World War I campaign hat (nicknamed the "Brown Round") and female drill sergeants wear the olive drab Australian bush cap. Starting in 2026, female drill sergeants will wear the campaign hat.

An army drill sergeant's normal tour of duty (called being "on the trail") is two years with a possible one-year extension. Drill sergeants may be assigned to units that conduct Basic Combat Training (BCT), reception, One-Station Unit Training (OSUT), or Advanced Individual Training (AIT). From 2007 to 2018, drill sergeants were replaced at AIT by AIT platoon sergeants (PSGs); In 2018, the AIT PSG program was discontinued and drill sergeants returned to AIT. Remaining AIT PSGs were "converted" to drill sergeants, earning their campaign hat and Drill Sergeant Identification Badge via a 10-day conversion course. BCT drill sergeants train approximately 11 cycles during their two-year tours. OSUT drill sergeants train recruits for an equivalent of BCT plus an additional number of weeks depending on the Military Occupational Specialty, so their average number of cycles is less than that of a BCT drill sergeant. AIT drill sergeants will train as many cycles as their tour of duty consists of depending on the length of the training. A cycle of 16 weeks would only be about 5 total cycles. The breaks between cycles are extremely short, creating an incredibly demanding environment for drill sergeants. It is not unusual for a cycle to graduate on a Thursday or Friday with new recruits arriving the following Monday or Tuesday.

Senior drill sergeants are the most senior NCO in a given training platoon, and are ultimately responsible for soldiers within or under their authority. The only NCO more senior to these individuals at the company level is the company's first sergeant, the senior enlisted leader and advisor to the company commander.

Successful completion of drill sergeant duty greatly enhances opportunities for promotion. Many of the U.S. Army's most senior noncommissioned officers are former drill sergeants.

The army has had a difficult time recruiting drill sergeant volunteers due to recent changes in doctrine and policy, with a recent study by the Department of Defense noting that fewer than 30% of drill sergeant candidates are volunteers. Past drill sergeants enjoyed much autonomy and latitude with which to train recruits and were reputed hands-on disciplinarians. Currently, the army's Training and Doctrine Command (TRADOC) has sought to shift this authority away and has moved closer to what is known as "Schofield's Definition of Discipline." It is now a punishable offense to use demeaning or derogatory terms to refer to recruits or trainees, and terms such as "warrior" or "soldier" are preferable. Additionally, it is a serious offense to punish recruits or trainees with "excessive" physical exercise, now known as hazing.

The United States Drill Sergeant Academy is located in Fort Jackson, South Carolina. This is where all drill sergeants go to complete their drill sergeant training. The academy is led by the commandant and deputy commandant of the Drill Sergeant Academy. The instructors, known as drill sergeant leaders (DSLs) are previously trained and experienced drill sergeants. DSLs are selected by a panel of current senior drill sergeant leaders, along with the leadership from the academy. DSLs are held to the same Army standards that new incoming drill sergeants are assessed on and must remain at those standards while instructing at the academy.

=== U.S. Marine Corps ===
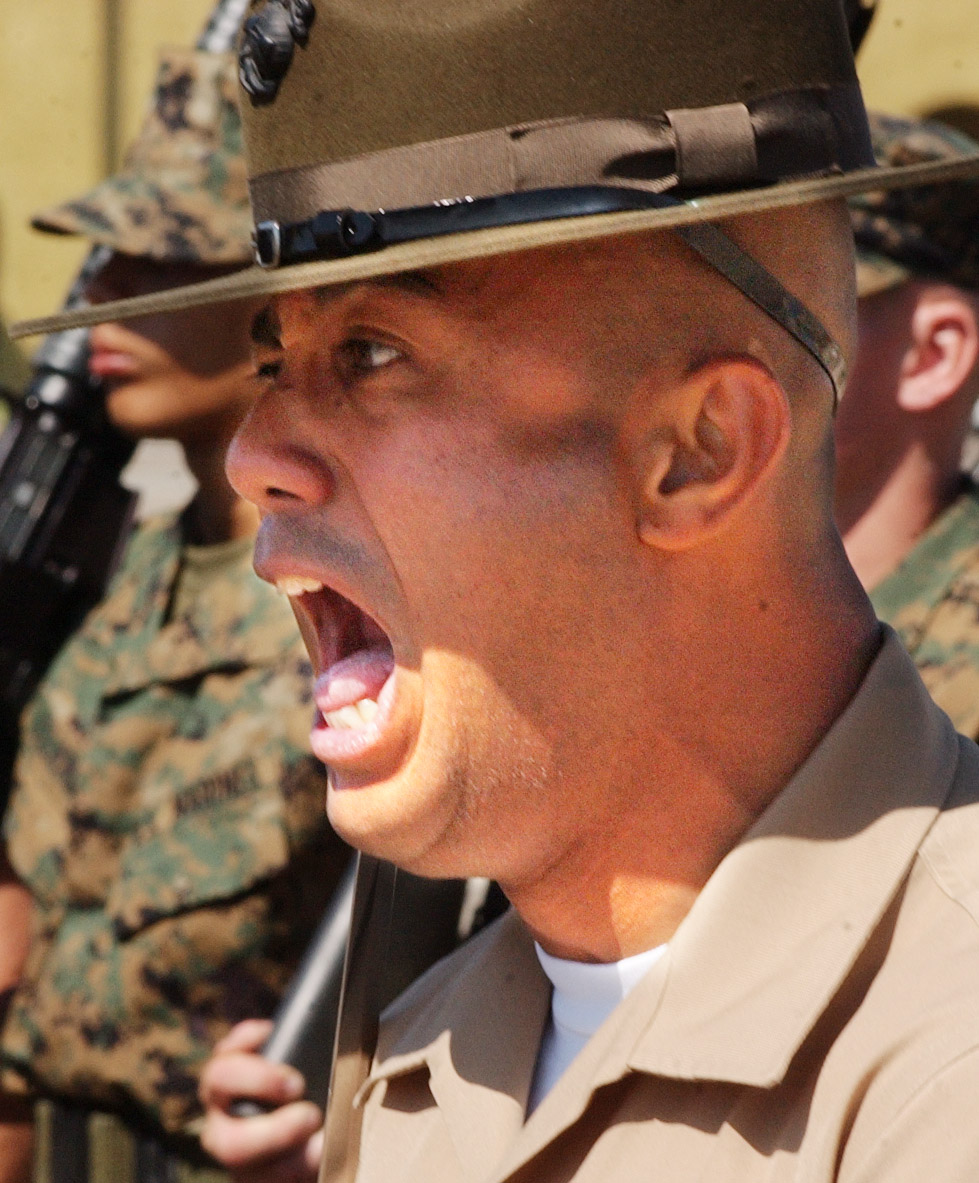
A USMC drill instructor

It may be taken offensively by U.S. Marine Corps drill instructors to be referred to as 'drill sergeants', which is strictly an army term in the American military, just as marines may take offense to being called "soldiers". This is considered to be a grievous insult if done intentionally. The only acceptable address of a drill instructor by a recruit is "sir", "ma'am" or "(senior) drill instructor (Rank) (last name)". At Officer Candidates School (OCS), candidates are instructed by drill instructors who have already served a tour at one of the Recruit Depots. Officer candidates address their instructors as "sergeant instructor" (and rank and last name), or "platoon sergeant" (and rank and last name). The OCS platoon sergeant is comparable to the senior drill instructor in an enlisted recruit platoon. In the initial phase of training, officer candidates are trained in almost the same manner, and by the same people, as enlisted Marines, with slight differences reflecting the difference between the responsibilities the candidates will have as second lieutenants and those the recruits will have as junior Marines.

In addition, drill instructors at either E-6 or E-7 also train naval officer candidates at the Navy's Officer Candidate School at Officer Training Command Newport, Rhode Island, a holdover from the days when they trained prospective naval aviators at the former Aviation Officer Candidate School (AOCS) at Naval Aviation Schools Command, Pensacola, Florida. Class drill instructors train officer candidates alongside class chief petty officers who have experience training Navy recruits as recruit division commanders (RDCs). Like Marine Corps recruits, navy officer candidates must address drill instructors as "Sir" or "Ma'am", even though the DI is not a commissioned officer.

In the U.S. Marine Corps, candidates for drill instructor school are both volunteers and designates. The Headquarters Marine Corps Special Duty Assignment Team creates a list known as the HSST List. This list has the names of Marines that have been slotted for the different B-Billets and Special Duty Assignments. Once a Marine's name comes up on this list, they must either serve the duty or prove that they are unfit for the assignment. The tour of duty is three years and demands the highest moral character and strength. It is the job of the drill instructor to pass these characteristics on to the future of the Corps. This duty is referred to as "Making Marines", and is one of the most important duties of a Marine's career. A drill instructor is directly involved in shaping the future of the United States Marine Corps. Marines report to either Marine Corps Recruit Depot Parris Island in South Carolina or to Marine Corps Recruit Depot San Diego in California, where they are assigned to Drill Instructor School. Upon graduation, they are assigned to one of the Recruit Training Battalions. Female Marines may now serve on both depots as drill instructors. Since spring 2016, Female drill instructors have begun serving in limited capacity on board Marine Corps Recruit Depot San Diego. This change took place in the Spring of 2016. Service as a drill instructor is considered a Special Duty Assignment in the Marine Corps (or "B" billet), which is factored into consideration of a Marine's eligibility for promotion. A Marine assigned to DI School must have at least a rank of sergeant (E-5), or have been selected for promotion to sergeant.

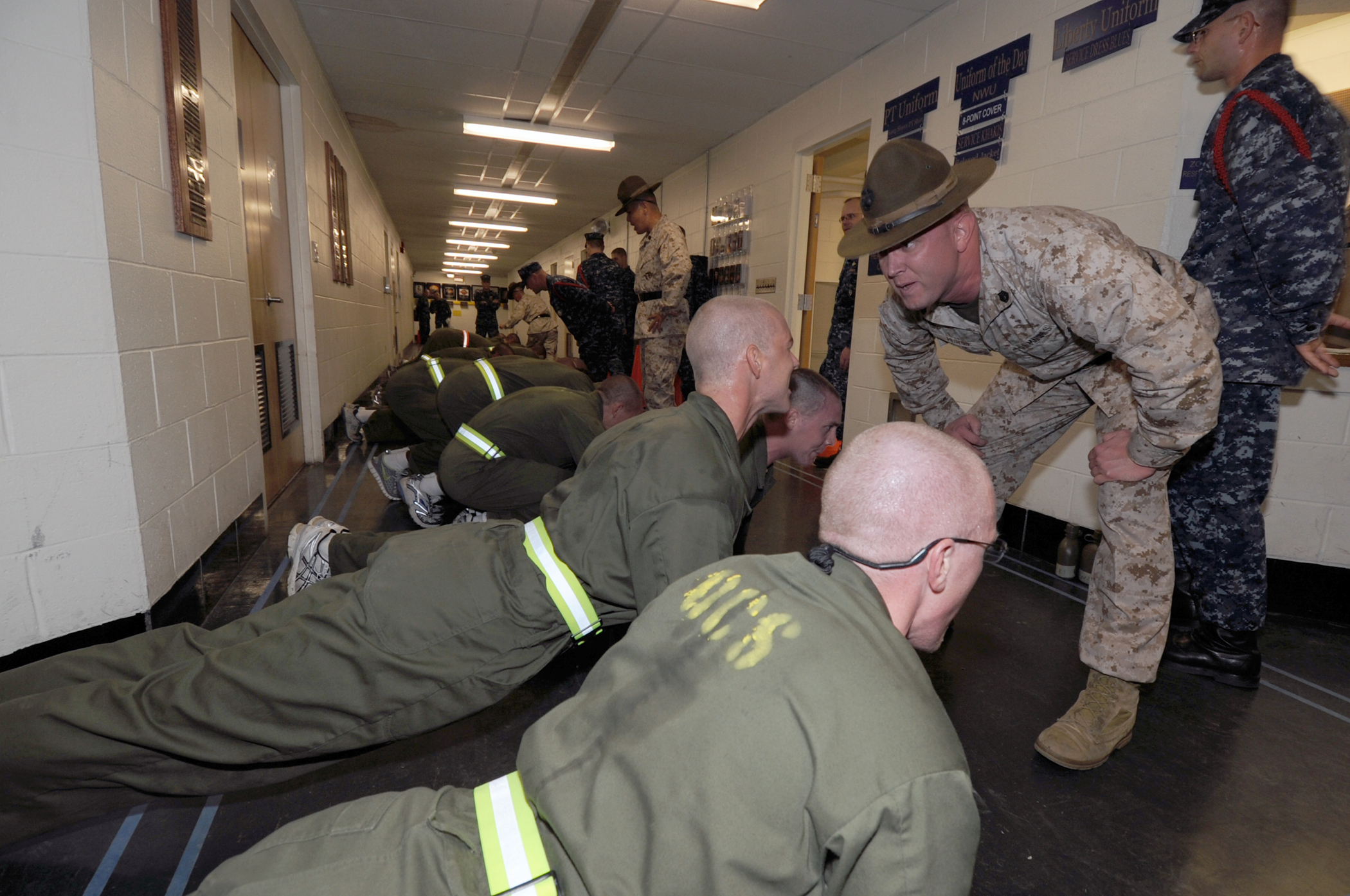
A drill instructor encourages an officer candidate to properly perform pushups.

The school requires DI School students to complete every task recruits are required to do. The typical training day begins around 4:00 a.m. or 0400 on the 24-hour clock (often referred to as "military time" in the US) and ends around 7:30 p.m. or 1930, many times with specific training evaluations and end-of-day cleanups that require even longer days. At the end of each day, DI School students have to practice effective time management in studying for exams, practicing drill, rehearsing the teaching of drill movements verbatim and preparing uniforms all while still making time for intense physical training. The school lasts approximately three months with four classes running throughout the year.

Physical training or "PT" as a unit is conducted at least three times a week, with each session lasting approximately two hours. In addition to warming up, stretching, and calisthenics, students complete the "DI Playground" a circuit course that focuses on enhancing upper body strength. Physical training also prepares the future drill instructors for the Marine Corps Physical Fitness Test which consists of pull-ups, abdominal crunches, and a 3-mile timed run. Since a drill instructor is often required to spend 20 hours a day or more on their feet and to move fast at all times, various running sessions are conducted to enhance speed and endurance. Students are led by their squad instructors in ability group runs based on speed, gradually increasing distance and speed throughout the course. Track workouts, formation runs, and fartlek runs are also a staple of the training. Drill and discipline are crucial parts of the Drill Instructor School curriculum.

Every student is continuously evaluated, corrected, and mentored, with special attention paid to the smallest of details, such as the placement of a finger within 1/4 inch of its required location along a trouser seam, angle of the weapon, and positioning of the student in relation to the unit. Required knowledge is constantly taught and evaluated in the form of written exams, practical applications, and inspections. Uniforms are inspected continually, with surprise inspections conducted randomly in addition to the scheduled inspections. The drill instructor is expected to convey the best possible Marine Corps image to recruits and to America and to conduct his/herself to the highest Marine Corps leadership and integrity standards as well as to impart these standards to every recruit they train. Drill instructors take a pledge which consists of the following words: "These recruits are entrusted to my care. I will train them to the best of my ability. I will develop them into smartly disciplined, physically fit, basically trained Marines, thoroughly indoctrinated in love of Corps and country. I will demand of them, and demonstrate by my own example, the highest standards of personal conduct, morality and professional skill."

Upon completion of Drill Instructor School, drill instructors are assigned to Recruit Training Battalions as junior members ("fourth hats", "third hats", "kill hats", "tray hats", "knowledge hats", "bobby", or "bulldogs") of drill instructor teams. Their job consists of constant corrections, dispensing punitive "Incentive Training" (IT), and keeping unremitting pressure on recruits to pay attention to details. He or she also teaches and reinforces academic knowledge to recruits. It is their duty to command the recruit platoon for initial drill evaluation, in which, in addition to the platoon receiving a score, the drill instructor is evaluated as well. These new drill instructors bear the burden of responsibility for breaking down a recruit's sense of self and selfishness, so that the more experienced drill instructors can focus the recruits on selflessness, obedience, and fraternity.

After completing a few 13-week cycles, the drill instructor is moved up to the position of experienced drill instructor (EDI), also called the "heavy", "drill hat" or "J Hat".

The next step in a drill instructor career is becoming a senior drill instructor. Senior drill instructors hold a respected position which is distinguished by the wearing of a black highly polished (patent leather) sword belt instead of a green duty belt. A senior drill instructor is ultimately accountable for the training of the platoon and for the efficiency of their assistant drill instructors. Although senior drill instructors are NCOs (sergeants) or staff NCOs, their position in the recruit training platoon is similar to that of a commissioned officer platoon commander in a line platoon. As such, they are further set apart from "junior" drill instructors.

After completing a number of cycles, drill instructors are often assigned to Support Battalion duties outside of recruit-training platoons. Such assignments are referred to as quotas, and include jobs as academic instructors, administrative duties at Recruit Processing (Receiving Barracks, also known as Receiving Company at MCRD San Diego), martial arts instructors, Medical Rehabilitation Platoon (MRP), Physical Conditioning Platoon (PCP), Combat Water Survival Instructors, Field Training Instructors (a.k.a. Black Shirts) [MCRD Parris Island only], and Instructional Training Company Instructors (ITC DI) [MCRD San Diego only].

Some drill instructors choose to do a second tour of duty on the drill field. These volunteers still report to Drill Instructor School, but are referred to as course challengers, and are only required to complete a short refresher course. Multiple tour drill instructors, based on rank and experience, are usually assigned as senior drill instructors, series chief drill instructors (MCRD San Diego) or series gunnery sergeants (MCRD Parris Island), DI school instructors, company first sergeants, or battalion sergeants major.

While in drill instructor status, both male and female DIs wear a World War I campaign hat with their service and utility uniforms.

For their successful service, Marine drill instructors are awarded the Drill Instructor Ribbon. This ribbon is also awarded to other enlisted marines and officers assigned to the recruit training environment, although these billets are recognized as being less directly involved in actually training recruits such as series and company commander/ XO, battalion executive officer, S-3, and commander, and various levels of sergeants major at each depot. At OCS, the ribbon is also awarded to officer candidate company first sergeants, company gunnery sergeants, and platoon commanders.

=== U.S. Navy ===
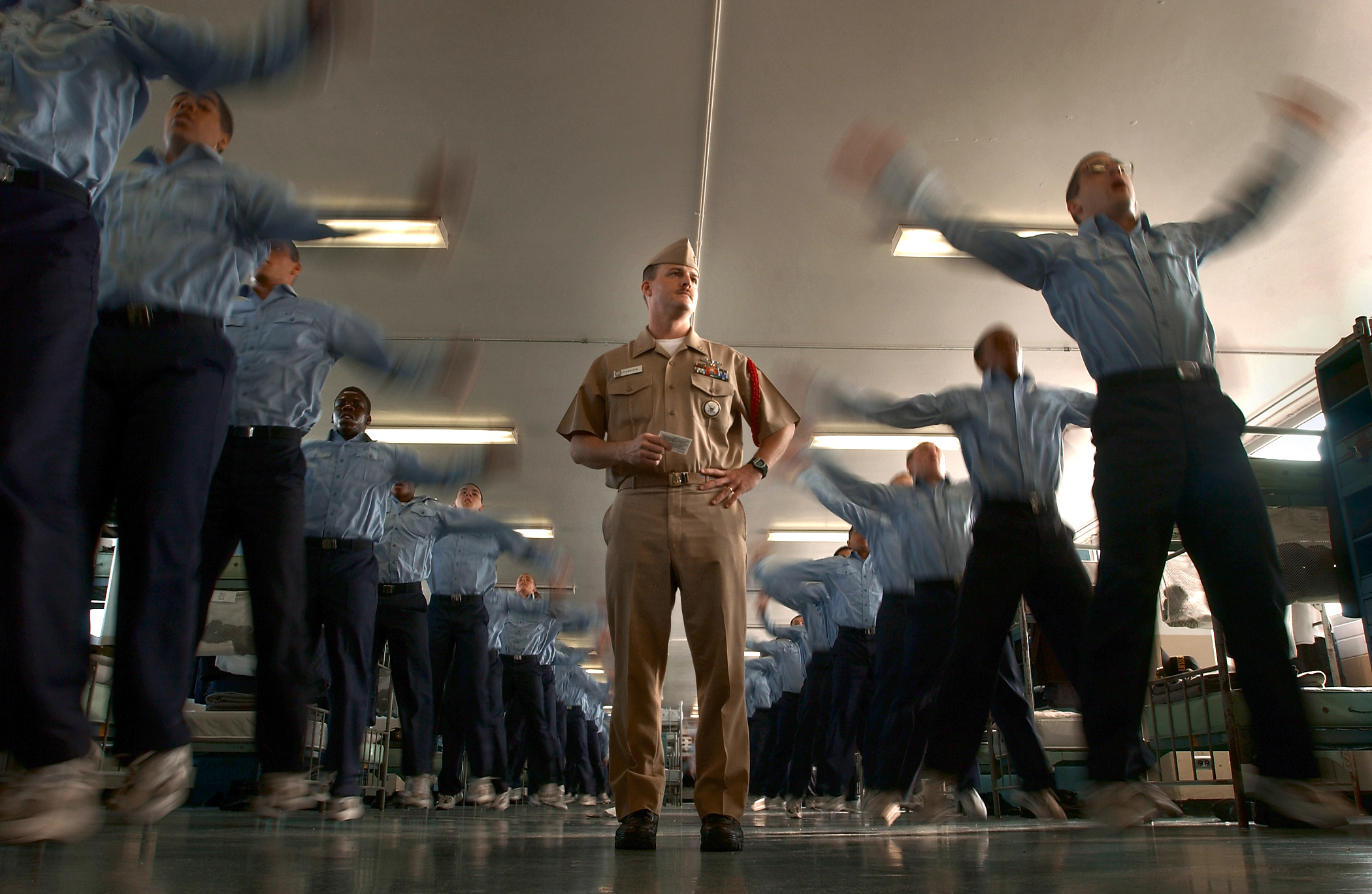
A Recruit Division Commander conducts "Instructional Training" to correct substandard performance during boot camp.

In the United States Navy, recruit training is conducted by recruit division commanders (RDCs, formerly company commanders or CCs) at Recruit Training Command Great Lakes, located at Naval Station Great Lakes, in North Chicago, Illinois. RDCs are usually E-6 (petty officer first class), but may be up to a master chief (E-9) and have at least six years time in service and above, who are volunteers that serve a three-year tour at RTC Great Lakes.

After submitting an approved package containing an endorsement from a commanding officer, prospective RDCs attend RDC "C" School located at RTC Great Lakes and are identified by the blue aiguillettes (ropes) they wear on the left shoulder of either their service, dress, or working uniforms. RDC School students typically spend thirteen weeks learning about the duties they will perform as RDCs, including drill and ceremony, classroom instruction, and uniform and compartment maintenance. They undergo routine uniform inspections, where RDC school staff (experienced RDCs) meticulously check for any deficiencies in a student's uniform. In addition, RDC School students spend three days a week undergoing physical training. Because of the intense workout periods, some RDC students find themselves unprepared; however, they must be ready to keep up with the recruits, some of them who are much younger or more athletic than they are. According to RDC "C" School staff, PT is the number one reason why some students drop out of the course.

Towards the end of RDC "C" School, RDC students shadow actual RDCs currently commanding a division. At the end of thirteen weeks, they receive their red ropes and badges which set them apart as RDCs. Following graduation and entering their first divisions, senior RDCs mentor these new junior RDCs, who then go on to gain experience with every new division (commonly referred to as a "push").

In the second year of their three-year tour, RDCs take a break from training divisions and perform other duties on base, including drill evaluations, practical training instruction, teaching classes at RDC "C" School, or Battle Stations 21.

RDC duty is considered a highly prestigious one as it is associated with higher levels of accession into the higher petty officer rates, including chief petty officer. RDC duty also allows Sailors an opportunity to earn the Master Training Specialist designator. At the end of the three-year tour, eligible RDCs receive the Recruit Training Service Ribbon, along with a choice of coast for their next duty stations.

In addition to training recruits at RTC Great Lakes, RDCs at E-7 (chief petty officer) or above who have experience leading recruit divisions train students at Officer Training Command in Newport, Rhode Island, either training prospective naval officers at Officer Candidate School (OCS) as class chief petty officers, alongside Marine Corps drill instructors, or newly commissioned junior officers in the Navy's Staff Corps (i.e. JAG, Medical Corps, Nurse Corps, etc.) at the Officer Development School (ODS).

=== U.S. Coast Guard ===
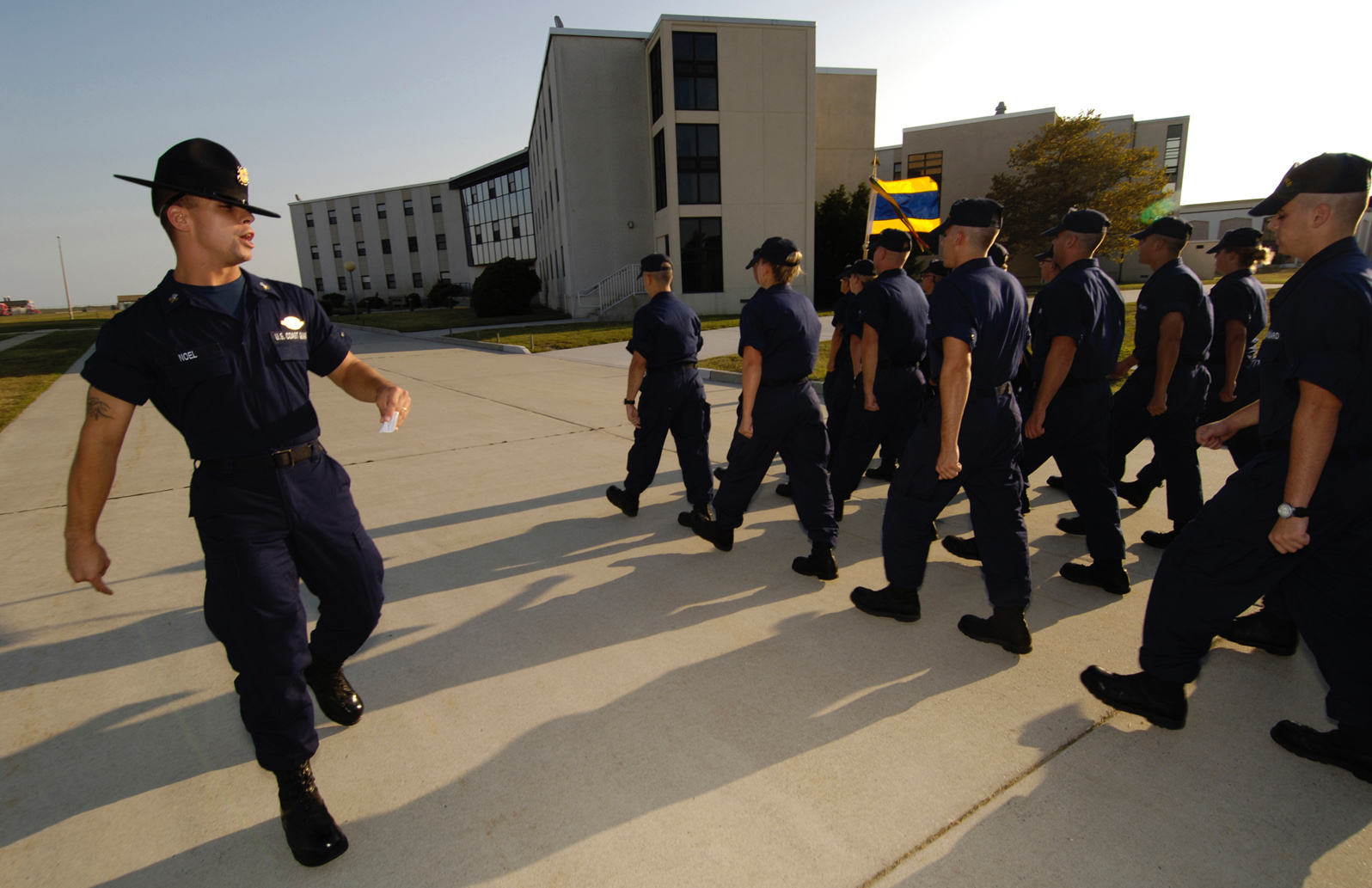
A Coast Guard company commander instructs recruits.

In the U.S. Coast Guard, company commanders are usually E-5 to E-8 and are special duty volunteers. Candidates attend Company Commander School in Cape May, New Jersey, which is collocated with recruit basic training. Upon completion, candidates then go in front of a board for final approval. Upon becoming a company commander (CC), the Coast Guardsman earns the right to wear the Company Commander Badge.

Coast Guard recruit companies average two or three CCs per, with the newer CCs serving as Assistants to the more experienced Lead CC.

During recent years, Coast Guard company commanders have gone to the United States Coast Guard Academy in New London, CT to train outgoing third class cadets during a week-long evolution called "100th Week", in which they are once again treated as incoming fourth class cadets by the CCs. The rationale behind this is to remind these cadets of their experiences coming into the academy, and to reinforce the mantra that they must do the things they will eventually demand of incoming Swabs. Later in the week, CCs begin teaching the cadets lessons on leadership. The experience provides third class cadets with invaluable experience they will need in training the new incoming fourth class cadets during Swab Summer.

== Canada ==
=== Canadian Armed Forces ===
The appointment of drill sergeant major (DSM) (French: Sergent-major instructeur (SMI)), is usually held by the most senior master warrant officer of an infantry regiment; an exception being with the Princess Patricia's Canadian Light Infantry, where that position is known as the quartermaster sergeant instructor or QMSI

In Basic Military Qualification, the course staff member that is teaching drill for a particular drill class is the "drill instructor" for that class.

== Cultural depiction ==
Drill instructors have a reputation as unforgiving taskmasters and they are often portrayed as such in popular culture, with notable examples being An Officer and a Gentleman and Full Metal Jacket, and a notable exception being Forrest Gump.
