= Battle buddy =

U.S. Army term for a soldier's assigned partner

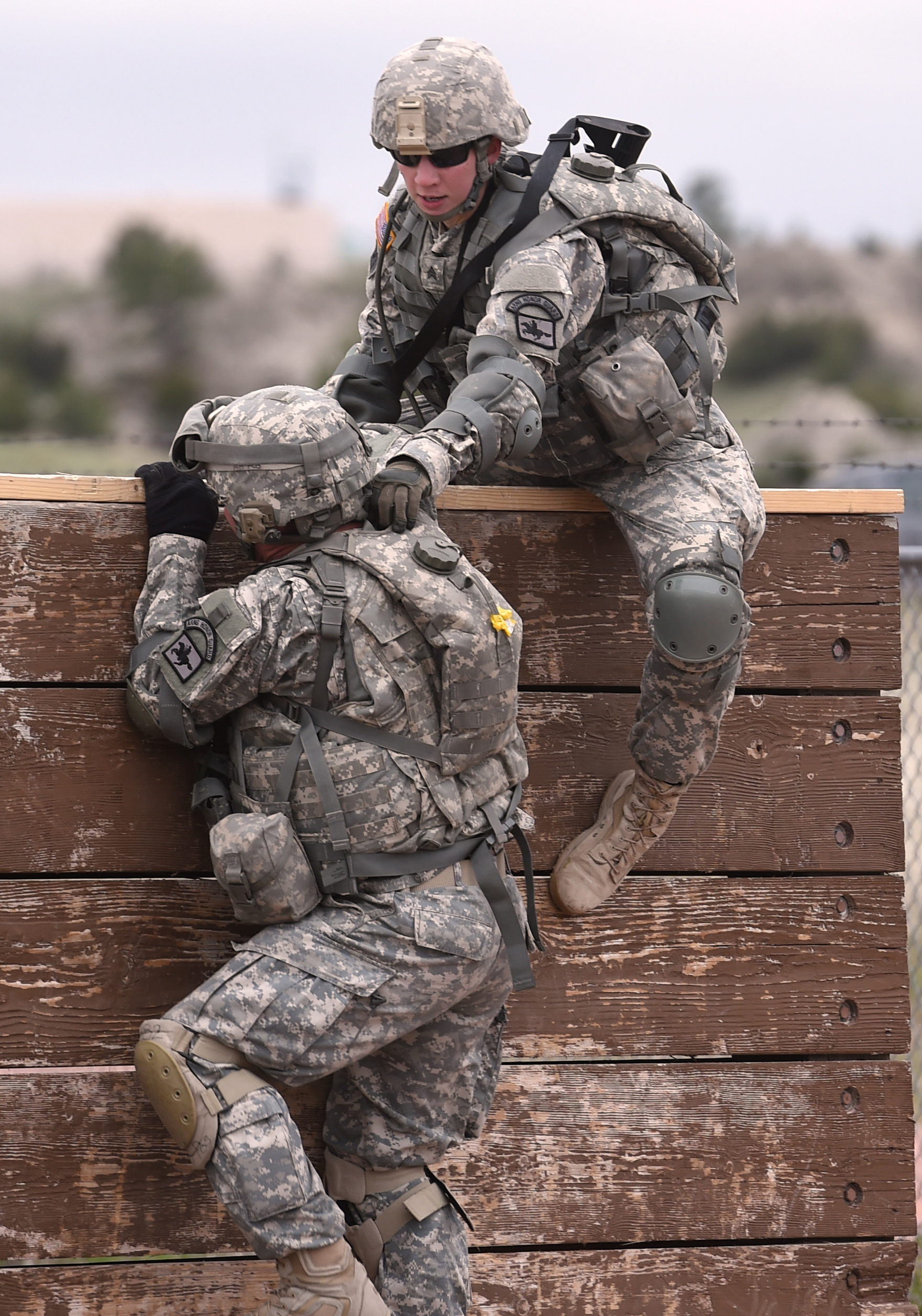
A Wyoming Army National Guard soldier helping her battle buddy climb a wall during obstacle course physical test

A battle buddy is a partner assigned to a soldier in the United States Army. Each battle buddy is expected to assist their partner both in and out of combat. A battle buddy is not only intended for company, but also for the reduction of suicide; since each watches their partner's actions, a battle buddy can save their fellow soldier's life by noticing negative thoughts and feelings and intervening to provide help. Most participating soldiers have reported satisfaction and have agreed that the Army should implement the system fully, although there have been cons reported as well.

== Advantages and disadvantages ==
Evaluations of the battle buddy system have identified the following advantages:

- Reduces rates of suicide and sexual assaults
- Buddies keep each other informed about key instructions and information
- Promotes cooperative problem-solving
- Increases morale
- Encourages soldiers and motivates increased confidence
- Decreases stress
- Eases transition to the military lifestyle
- Improves safety in training and combat
- Promotes better leadership skills

The following potential disadvantages have also been identified:

- Personality conflicts can cause tension and decrease positive effects
- Adds extra responsibilities
- Interferes with desired activities
- Requires the commitment of caring for another person

== Evaluations ==
Soldiers were asked to evaluate and rate their satisfaction with the "Battle Buddy Team Assignment Program" in order to gauge whether the program should be implemented by the Army. Surveys were created to assess:

- The role of personality variables
- Self-assessments of successes due to battle buddies
- Potential situational influences
- Buddy interactions/assessments

The following table displays soldiers' ratings of satisfaction with the Battle Buddy system:

Disliked Very Much	Disliked	Neither	Liked	Liked Very much
5%	4%	10%	31%	50%

This table shows soldiers' agreement that battle buddies are good Army practice:

Strongly disagree	Disagree	Neither agree nor disagree	Agree	Strongly agree
5%	5%	22%	24%	44%

== Suicide prevention ==
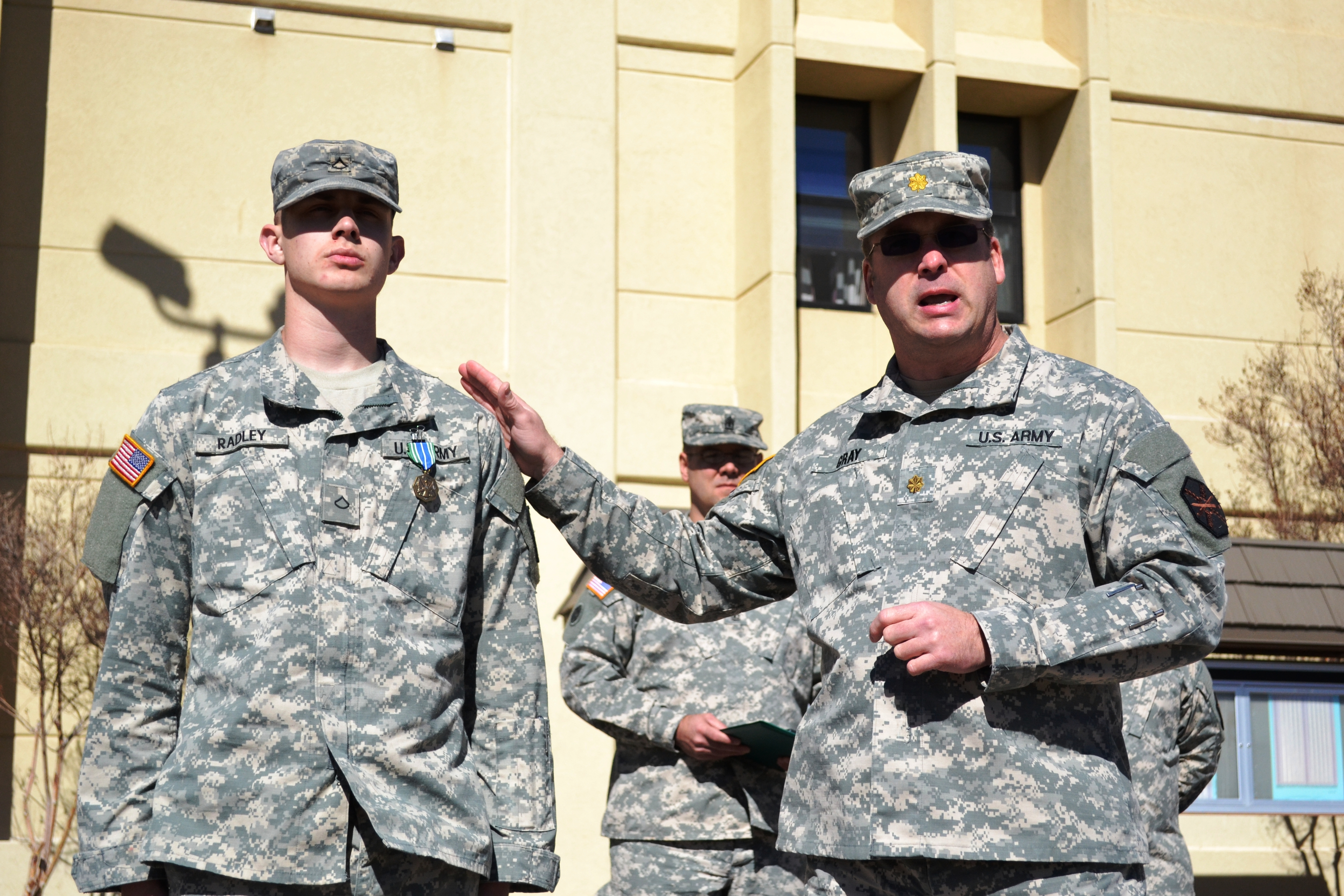
A private first class (left) being awarded the Achievement Medal for potentially preventing the death of his overmedicated and drunk battle buddy

Suicide prevention is a major objective of the battle buddy system. In 2006, the suicide rate in the U.S. Army increased by 37% and, by 2009, there were 344 completed suicides by military personnel (211 of whom were members of the Army). In response, efforts to identify suicide prevention initiatives have increased; military and legislative officials found the assignment of battle buddies to be an effective method of decreasing military suicide rates.

== See also ==
- Buddy system
- Suicide prevention
