= Military training leader =

Type of non-commissioned officer in the USAF

A U.S. Air Force military training leader (MTL) is a non-commissioned officer with specific duties. They are assigned the duty of transitioning non-prior service airmen in the Air Force into the personal adjustment to military life. The MTLs' main responsibility is to continue the training the airman has learned in basic military training.

== MTL history ==
The military training leader (8B100) career field has undergone numerous changes to make it what it is today. Student training advisor (STA) first started around 1973 as 99128's. At that time they were combined with the military training instructors and then split to their own AFSC (99138) in 1975. In late 1991 the name was changed to military training manager.

In October 1998, Chief Master Sergeant Doug Hodge changed the name to military training leader. This name was created as a more descriptive way to explain the duties of this position. Showing how leadership was paramount in this position. Being able to show leadership is what being an MTL is all about.

Another change to the program was the creation of a Command MTL position at 2 Air Force on 7 Aug 1997. Command MTLs are the OPR for all NPS military training programs and responsible for the selection and training of all assigned MTLs.

Prior to a phase program airmen went from basic military training's very structured, controlled environment to a "no rules" tech school environment; discipline problems were common.

Phase programs were instituted at several tech-training locations in the early 80's, but a standardized MAJCOM directed phase program was not implemented until 1996; a MAJCOM directed phase program was implemented 1983 (est.)

AETCI 36-2216, Administration of Military Standards and Discipline Training, directs the phase program.

MTL Mission: To adapt NPS airmen to military life and provide the Air Force with highly trained, motivated, self-disciplined, and physically fit airmen with exceptional military bearing.

Unlike the Army, the Air Force uses a different specialist (MTLs) to continue military training during advanced individual or technical training.

What we know now as Military Training Leaders was created in 1973.

Over the years the name has changed but the responsibilities has increased.

- Student Training Advisor 1973–1992
- Military Training Manager 1992–1998
- Military Training Leader 1998–present

== Locations ==
CONUS locations with Military Training Leaders: (as of September 2009):

Most people are unaware of how many locations in the CONUS there are Military Training Leaders assigned. There are over 37 locations. The bases under the bold indicate the Detachment or Geographically Separated Unit.

Headquarters Second Air Force, Keesler Air Force Base

- Goodfellow Air Force Base
- Presidio of Monterrey (Army Base), California
- Naval Air Station Pensacola Corry Station (Navy Base), Florida
- Fort Huachuca (Army Base), Arizona

Lackland Air Force Base

- Kirtland Air Force Base, New Mexico
- Hurlburt Field, Florida
- Naval Support Activity Panama City, Florida
- Pope Air Force Base, North Carolina
- Camp Bullis (Army Base), Texas
- Port of Hueneme (Navy Base), California

Keesler Air Force Base

- Fort George G. Meade (Army Base), Maryland
- Fort Gordon (Army Base), Georgia

Sheppard Air Force Base

- Marine Corps Air Station New River (Marine Base), North Carolina
- Fort Eustis (Army Base), Virginia
- Aberdeen Proving Grounds (Army Base), Maryland
- Naval Air Station Pensacola (Navy Base), Florida
- Eglin Air Force Base, Florida
- NCBC Gulfport (Navy Base), Mississippi
- Fort Leonard Wood (Army Base), Missouri
- Tyndall Air Force Base, Florida
- Davis-Monthan Air Force Base, Arizona
- Luke Air Force Base, Arizona
- Beale Air Force Base, California
- Dover Air Force Base, DE
- Little Rock Air Force Base, Arkansas
- Charleston Air Force Base, South Carolina
- Tinker Air Force Base, Oklahoma
- McChord Air Force Base, Washington
- Fort Sam Houston, Texas

Vandenberg Air Force Base, California

Headquarters Nineteenth Air Force, Randolph Air Force Base

- Altus Air Force Base, Oklahoma
- Kirtland Air Force Base, New Mexico
- Little Rock Air Force Base, Arkansas
- Fairchild Air Force Base, Washington
- Randolph Air Force Base, Texas

Air Force Materiel Command, Wright-Patterson Air Force Base

- Wright-Patterson Air Force Base, Ohio

59th Medical Wing, Lackland Air Force Base

- Lackland Air Force Base, Texas

== Military training leader photo gallery ==
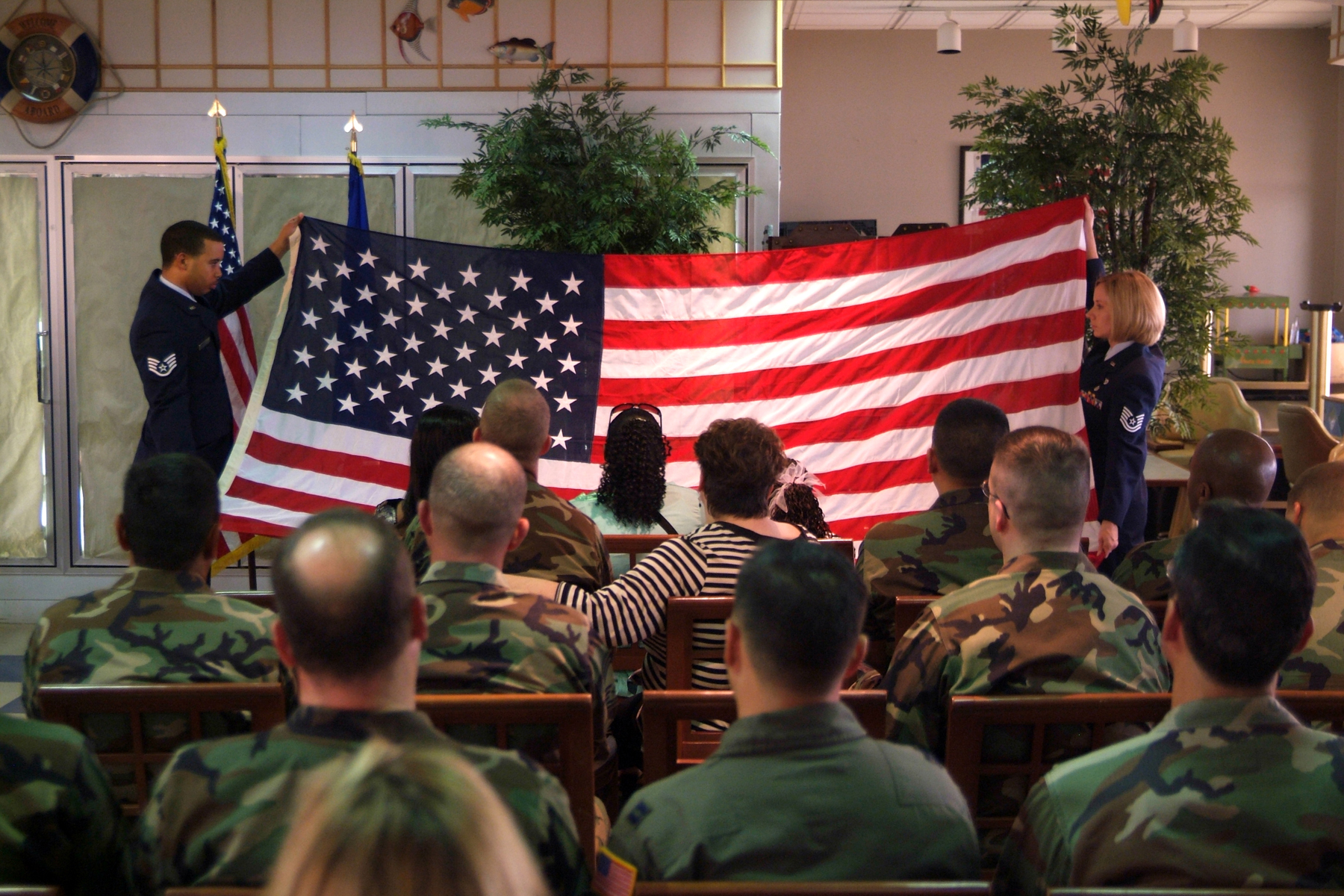
Flag folding

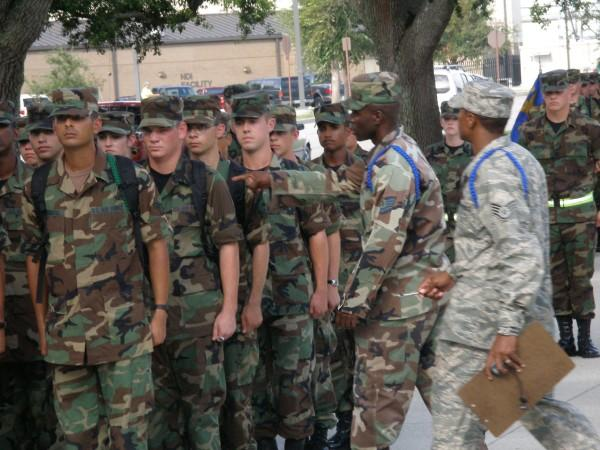
Monitoring airmen

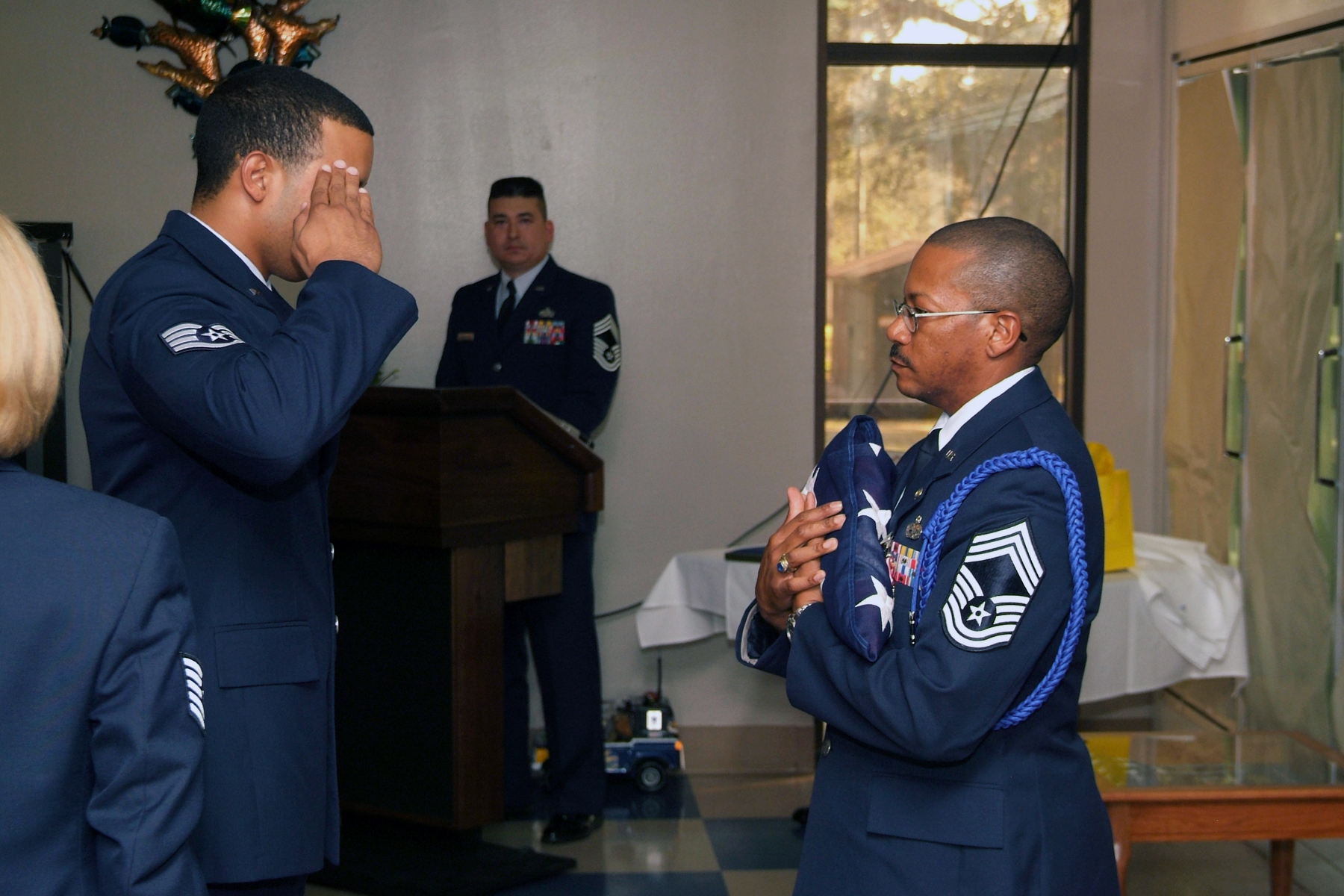
Drill and ceremonies

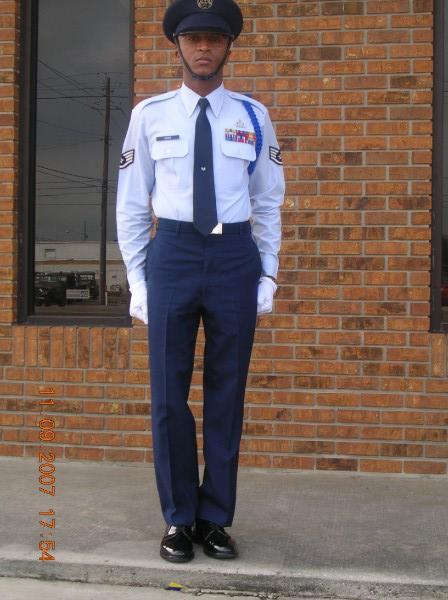
Military training leader

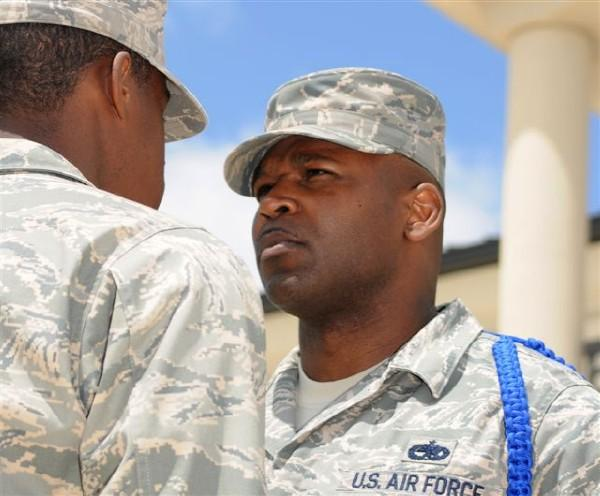
Open ranks inspection

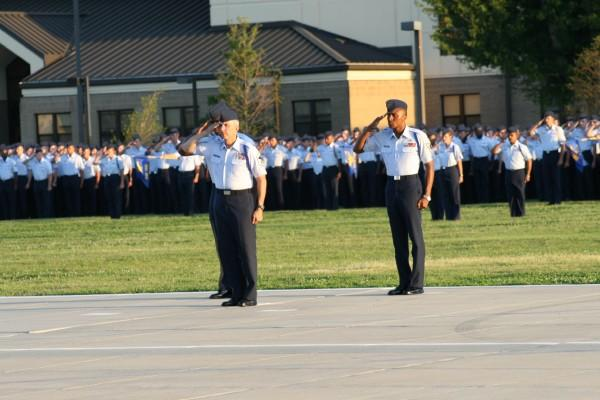
Parade
