= Air Operations Center =

Type of command center used by the United States Air Force

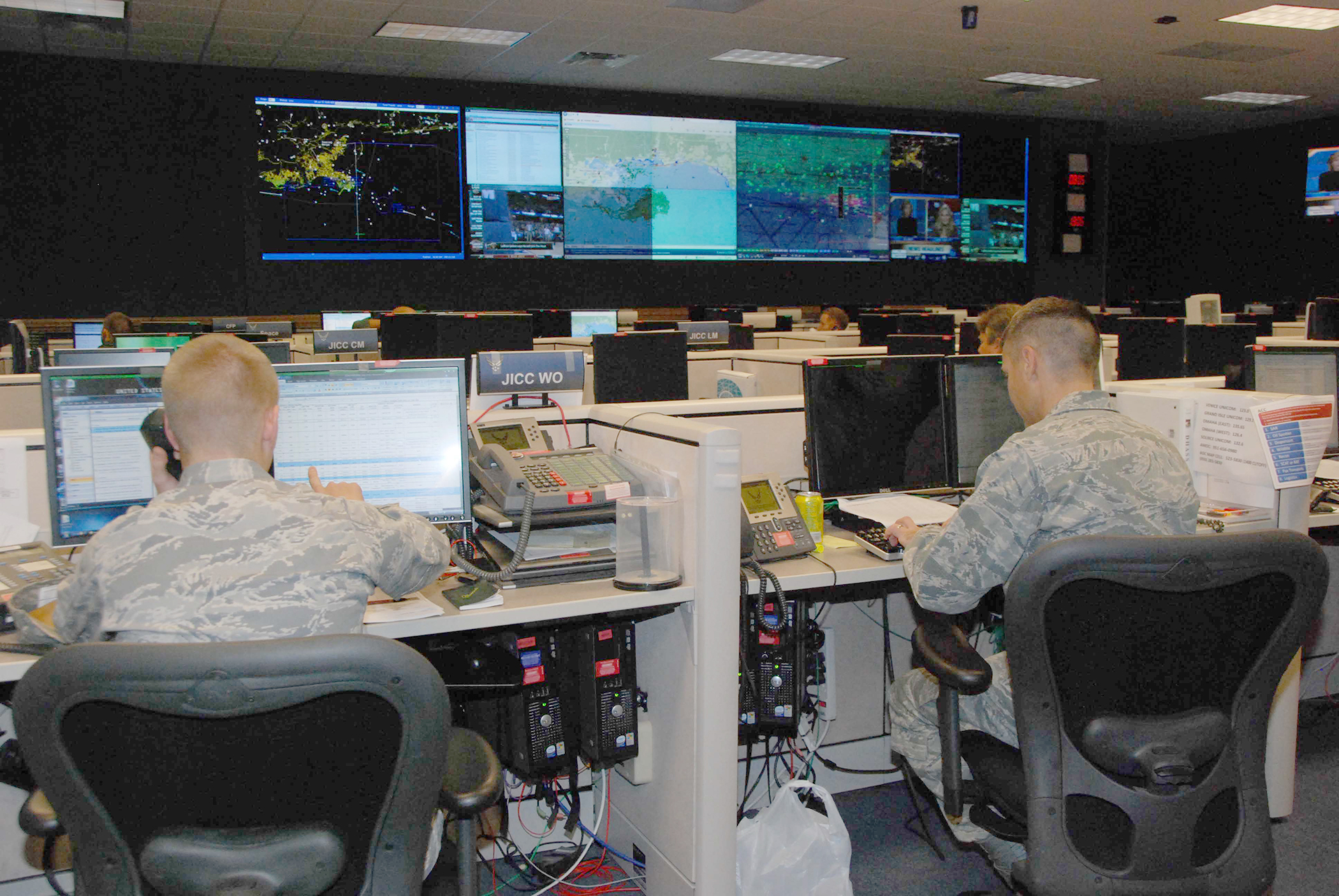
601st Air Operations Center at Tyndall AFB, Florida

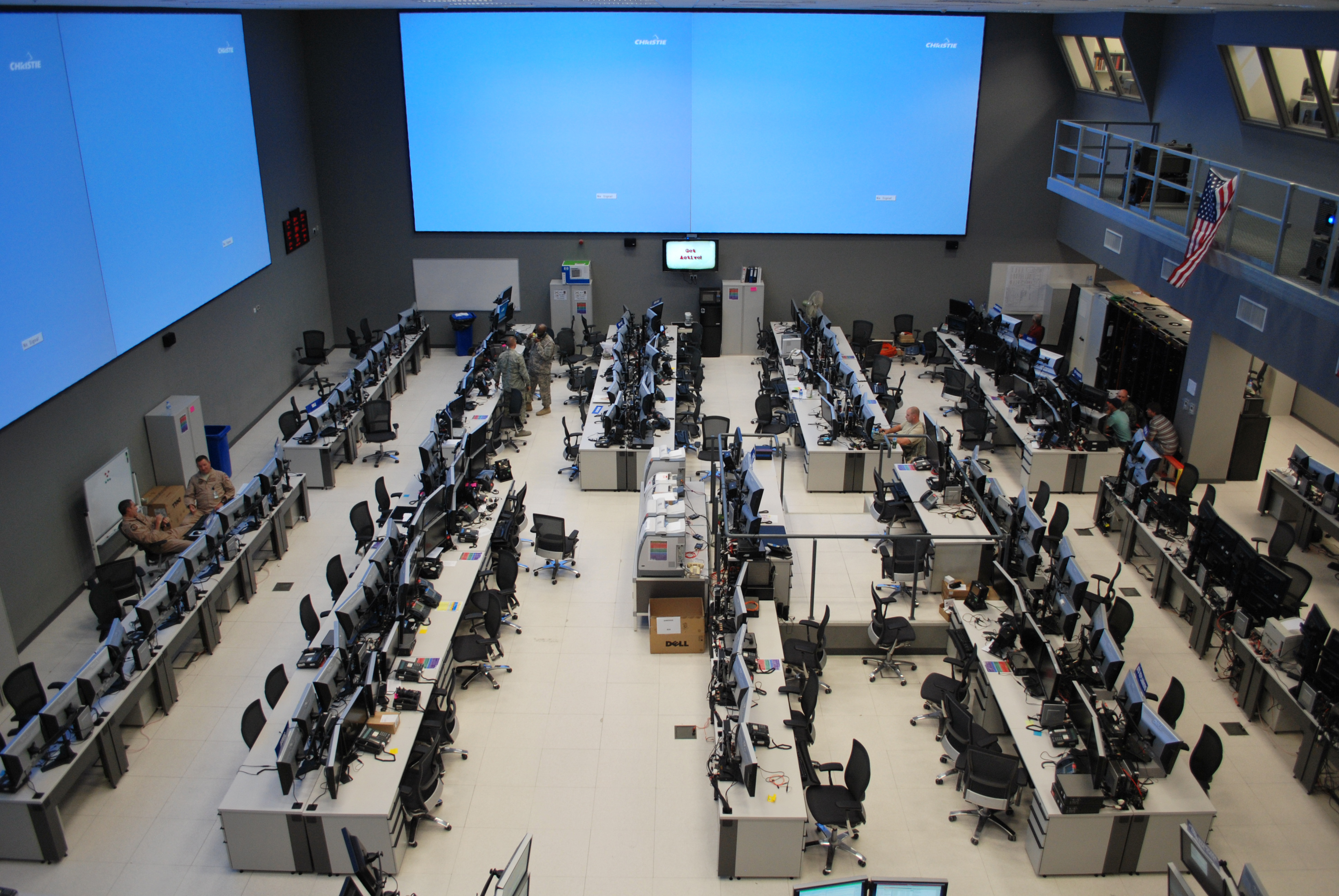
USAFCENT CAOC at Al Udeid Air Base, Qatar, 2009

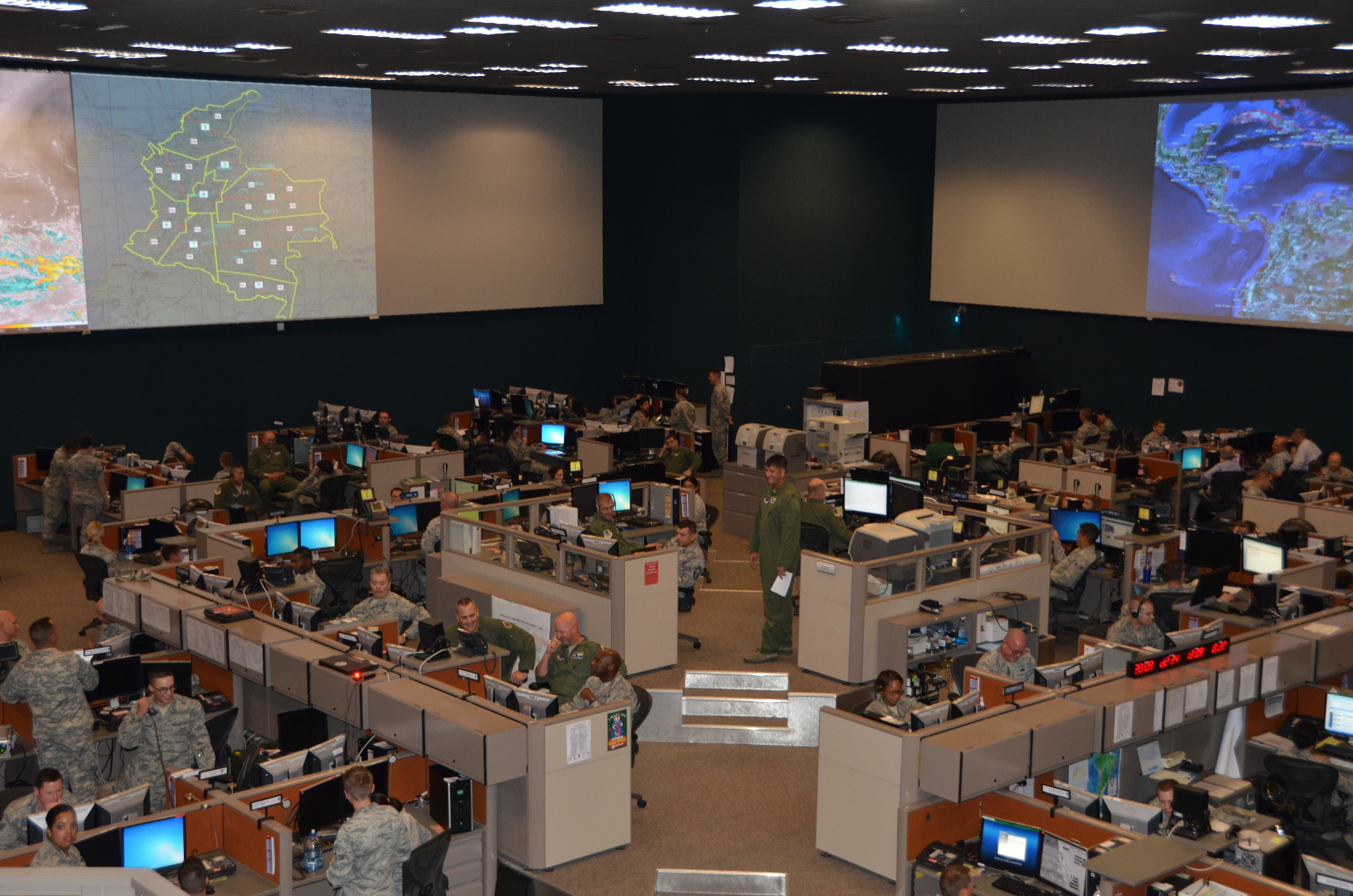
A look inside the Gen. James H. Doolittle Combined Air Operations Center facility (612th Air Operations Center) at Davis-Monthan Air Force Base, Ariz., 2013

An Air Operations Center (AOC) is a type of command center used by the United States Air Force (USAF). It is the senior agency of the Air Force component commander to provide command and control of air operations.

The United States Air Force employs two kinds of AOCs: regional AOCs utilizing the AN/USQ-163 Falconer weapon system that support geographic combatant commanders, and functional AOCs that support functional combatant commanders. When there is more than one U.S. military service working in an AOC, such as when naval aviation from the U.S. Navy (USN) and/or the U.S. Marine Corps (USMC) is incorporated, it is called a Joint Air Operations Center (JAOC). In cases of allied or coalition (multinational) operations in tandem with USAF or Joint air operations, the AOC is called a Combined Air Operations Center (CAOC).

An AOC is the senior element of the Theater Air Control System (TACS). The Joint Force Commander (JFC) assigns a Joint Forces Air Component Commander (JFACC) to lead the AOC weapon system. If allied or coalition forces are part of the operation, the JFC and JFACC will be redesignated as the CFC and CFACC, respectively.

Quite often the Commander, Air Force Forces (COMAFFOR) is assigned the JFACC/CFACC position for planning and executing theater-wide air forces. If another service also provides a significant share of air forces, the Deputy JFACC/CFACC will typically be a senior flag officer from that service. For example, during Operation Enduring Freedom and Operation Iraqi Freedom, when USAF combat air forces (CAF) and mobility air forces (MAF) integrated extensive USN and USMC sea-based and land-based aviation and Royal Air Force (RAF) and Royal Navy / Fleet Air Arm aviation, the CFACC was an aeronautically rated USAF lieutenant general, assisted by an aeronautically designated USN rear admiral (upper half) as the Deputy CFACC, and an aeronautically rated RAF air commodore as the Senior British Officer (Air).

== Battlecab ==
The Command element occupies the Battlecab, which houses offices for the senior leadership and provides oversight of the Combat Operations floor. The Air Component Commander, normally a 3* NATO OF-8 (O-9) Lt General is the overall Commander of the Air Component and has oversight of their AOC.

There will usually be a 2* NATO OF-7 (O-8) Major General who is the Deputy CJFACC and has day to day command of the Air Component and oversight of the AOC. The AOC Commander, would normally be a 1* NATO OF-6 (O-7) Brigadier General who commands the whole AOC facility and answers to the ACC. There would then be at least 2 AOC Directors NATO OF-5 (O-6) Colonels who would oversee the Battlecab and maintain a 24/7 shift watch over all aspects of CAOC decision making.

== Divisions ==
There are five divisions in the AOC. These separate, but distinct, organizations fuse information that eventually becomes the Air Tasking Order. Staffing of these divisions consists primarily of USAF officers of various specialities in the ranks of captain, major and lieutenant colonel, supported by a smaller cohort of enlisted airmen, typically in the rank of staff sergeant and above. When conducting joint air operations, U.S. Army and USMC officers of similar rank and USN officers in the ranks of lieutenant, lieutenant commander and commander will also provide augmentative manning as required, the majority of whom will be aeronautically rated/aeronautically designated. Senior leadership oversight of the AOC is provided by USAF colonels and general officers and USN captains and flag officers.

=== Strategy Division (SRD) ===
- Strategy Plans Team (SPT)
- Strategy Guidance Team (SGT)
- Operational Assessment Team (OAT)
- Information Operations Team (IOT)

=== Combat Plans Division (CPD) ===
- Target Effects Team
- Master Air Attack Plan Team
- Air Tasking Order Production Team
- Command and Control Planning Team

=== Combat Operations Division (COD) ===
- Chief of Combat Operations (CCO) "CRESCENT"
- Offensive Ops Team - Led by the Senior Offensive Duty Officer (SODO) "FIREBRAND"
  - Electronic Warfare Cell (EWC) "LIGHTNING"
  - Dynamic Targeting Cell (DTC) "SANDMAN"
- Defensive Ops Team - Led by the Senior Air Defence Officer (SADO) "KMART"
- ISR Operations Team - Led by the Senior Intelligence Duty Officer (SIDO) "BISHOP"
- Joint Personnel Recovery Cell (JPRC) "DELIVERENCE"
- Interface Control - Led by the Joint Interface Control Officer (JICO), responsible for tactical datalinks and communications
- Weather Specialty Team "CYCLONE"
- Cyber Liaison Team
- Naval Amphibious Liaison Element (NALE)
  - USN + USMC; NALE also provides personnel/support to CPD and ISRD
- Battlefield Coordination Detachment (BCD)
- Special Operations Liaison Element (SOLE)

=== Intelligence, Surveillance, Reconnaissance Division (ISRD) ===
- Analysis, Correlation, and Fusion
- Targeting and Tactical Assessment
- Imagery Support Element (ISE)
- ISR Plans - Produce the ATO RSTA Annex for Collection Operations Management (COM)

=== Air Mobility Division (AMD) ===
- AMD Chief
- Deputy AMD Chief
- Superintendent
- Air Mobility Control Team (AMCT)
  - Execution Cell
  - Mission Management
  - Flight Management
  - USAPAT Mission Planner
  - Maintenance
- Airlift Control Team (ALCT)
  - Airlift Plans
  - DV Airlifts
  - Diplomatic Clearance
  - Requirements
- Air Refueling Control Team (ARCT)
- Aeromedical Evacuation Control Team (AECT)
- Unique Missions Support Team (AMDU)

== Active Air Operations Centers ==
List of Active US Air Force Air Operations Centers
Name	Emblem	Location	Unit assigned to (ADCON)	Maintains TACON for which Air Component	Servicing Air Component's Area of Responsibility (AOR)	Type	Role
601st Air Operations Center		Tyndall AFB, Florida	First Air Force	Air Forces Northern (AFNORTH) (Note: Unlike Component-MAJCOMs (C-MAJCOMs), Component-Numbered Air Forces (C-NAFs) use these other descriptive labels when referring to OPCON as the USAF Service Component for their assigned Unified / Sub-unified Combatant Command. The Numbered Air Force label is used when referring to ADCON functions. They are both different names for the same organization.) (Note: AFNORTH operates under the CONUS NORAD Region (CONR) label when referring to airspace defense missions. The CONR HQ is co-located with the 601 AOC. TACON for airspace defense missions is delegated from the co-located USNORTHCOM and NORAD Headquarters to CONR HQ, and then is delegated to either the Eastern Air Defense Sector (EADS) (callsign HUNTRESS) or Western Air Defense Sector (WADS) (callsign BIGFOOT).)	US Northern Command (USNORTHCOM) (excluding ALCOM AOR) (Note: In the context of airspace defense missions, the AOR excludes both the Alaskan NORAD Region (ANR) and Canadian NORAD Region (CANR).)	Regional	Command and control for homeland security and civil support missions for US Northern Command. (Note: TACON for the Air Sovereignty Alert (ASA) mission is maintained by the North American Aerospace Defense Command (NORAD).)
603rd Air Operations Center Callsign: WOLFHOUND		Ramstein AB, Germany	US Air Forces in Europe – Air Forces Africa	US Air Forces in Europe (USAFE) (Note: The Component-MAJCOM (C-MAJCOM) is known as this label when referring to operations within this AOR, even though it is under the same organization as the other AOR.)	US European Command (USEUCOM)	Regional	Command and control of air operations in Europe and Africa.
603rd Air Operations Center Callsign: WOLFHOUND		Ramstein AB, Germany	US Air Forces in Europe – Air Forces Africa	Air Forces Africa (AFAFRICA)	US Africa Command (USAFRICOM)	Regional	Command and control of air operations in Europe and Africa.
607th Air Operations Center Callsign: COBRA		Osan AB, South Korea	Seventh Air Force	Air Forces Korea (AFKOR)	US Forces Korea (USFK)	Regional	Command and control of air operations in the Korean peninsula, supporting US Forces Korea.
608th Air Operations Center Callsign: RED RIVER		Barksdale AFB, Louisiana	Eighth Air Force	Air Forces Strategic-Air (AFSTRAT-AIR)	US Strategic Command (USSTRATCOM)	Functional	Also known as the Also known as the Joint-Global Strike Operations Center (J-GSOC). It provides command and control of long-range strike missions.
609th Air Operations Center Callsign: KINGPIN (Note: Communication with aircraft handled by 727th Expeditionary Air Control Squadron)		Al Udeid AB, Qatar Det 1: Shaw AFB, South Carolina	Ninth Air Force	Air Forces Central (AFCENT)	US Central Command (USCENTCOM)	Regional	Also known as the Combined Air Operations Center (CAOC), commands and controls the USAF operations from Northeast Africa across the Middle East to Central and South Asia.
611th Air Operations Center Callsign: TOP ROCC		JB Elmendorf-Richardson, Alaska	Eleventh Air Force	Pacific Air Forces (PACAF) (Note: 11AF is not necessarily the USAF Service Component for ALCOM. However, the 11AF Commander is dual-hatted as the ALCOM Commander and Commander of the Alaskan NORAD Region (ANR). 11AF is effectively “Air Forces Alaska” (the Component-Numbered Air Force for ALCOM) in all but name. This is because although PACAF has delegated TACON for missions over ALCOM to 611 AOC, PACAF retains OPCON over 11AF’s units.)	Alaskan Command (ALCOM) (Note: 611 AOC is colocated with the Alaskan NORAD Region (ANR) Region Air Operations Center (RAOC). 611 AOC’s AOR is coincident with the ANR in the context of airspace defense missions)	Regional	Command and control for the Alaskan Region of North American Aerospace Defense Command (NORAD), Alaskan Command and Eleventh Air Force within and surrounding Alaska.
612th Air Operations Center		Davis Mothan AFB, Arizona	Twelfth Air Force	Air Forces Southern (AFSOUTH)	US Southern Command (USSOUTHCOM)	Regional	Command and control of USAF operations in the Caribbean, Central and South America.
613th Air Operations Center		JB Pearl Harbor-Hickam, Hawaii	Pacific Air Forces	Pacific Air Forces (PACAF)	US Indo-Pacific Command (USINDOPACOM) (excluding USFK AOR)	Regional	Command and control of USAF operations in the throughout the Indo-Asia-Pacific region.
616th Operations Center		JB San Antonio-Lackland, Texas	Sixteenth Air Force	Air Forces Cyber (AFCYBER)	US Cyber Command (USCYBERCOM)	Functional	Command and control of USAF worldwide intelligence, surveillance & reconnaissance and cyberwarfare operations.
618th Air Operations Center Callsign: HILDA		Scott AFB, Illinois	Air Mobility Command	Air Mobility Command (AMC) (Note: Referred as the label in parentheses when referring to OPCON while serving as the Air Component for the specified Unified / Sub-unified Combatant Command. The Numbered Air Force label is used when referring to ADCON functions.)	US Transportation Command (USTRANSCOM)	Functional	Also known as Tanker Airlift Control Center (TACC), it plans, schedules and directs airlift, air-refueling and aeromedical evacuation operations around the world.
Combined Air Operations Center - Experimental		Joint Base Langley–Eustis, Virginia	Air Combat Command	US Air Force Warfare Center	N/A	Test and Evaluation	Test bed for command and control systems. Operated by the 505th Command and Control Wing.
Combined Air Operations Center - Nellis Callsign: RHINO		Nellis AFB, Nevada	Air Combat Command	US Air Force Warfare Center	N/A	Training	Provides command and control training to the US Military and coalition partners. Operated by the 505th Command and Control Wing.

== Inactive Air Operations Centers ==
List of Inactive US Air Force Air Operations Centers
Name	Emblem	Location	Country	Major Command	Named or Numbered Air Force	Unified Combat Command	Type	Role
614th Air Operations Center		Vandenberg AFB, California	United States	United States Space Force	Space Operations Command	US Space Command	Functional	Transitioned to the US Space Force with the rest of Air Force Space Command on 20 December 2019.
617th Air and Space Operations Center		Ramstein AB	Germany	United States Air Forces Africa	Seventeenth Air Force (Air Forces Africa)	US Africa Command	Regional	Operational between 1 October 2008 and 1 October 2011. Merged with 603rd AOC.
623rd Air Operations Center		Hurlburt Field, Florida	United States	Air Force Special Operations Command	Twenty-Third Air Force (Air Forces Special Operations Forces)	US Special Operations Command	Functional	Re-designated as the Air Force Special Operations Air Warfare Center (AFSOAWC) on 11 February 2013. Provided command and control of special forces.
624th Operations Center		Joint Base San Antonio, Texas	United States	Air Combat Command	Sixteenth Air Force (Air Forces Cyber)	US Cyber Command	Functional	Merged with 625th Operations Center to become 616th Operations Center in 2020.
625th Operations Center		Joint Base San Antonio, Texas	United States	Air Combat Command	Sixteenth Air Force (Air Forces Cyber)	US Cyber Command	Functional	Merged with 624th Operations Center to become 616th Operations Center in 2020.

== AOC-equipping Units ==
- 102d Air Operations Group – Otis ANGB, Cape Cod, Massachusetts (Massachusetts Air National Guard)
- 103d Air Operations Group – East Granby, Connecticut (Connecticut Air National Guard)
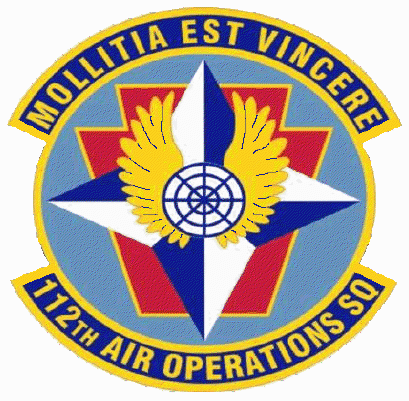
- 193d Air Operations Group formally known as the 112th Air Operations Squadron – State College, Pennsylvania (Pennsylvania Air National Guard)
- 152d Air Operations Group – Hancock Field ANGB, Syracuse, New York (New York Air National Guard)
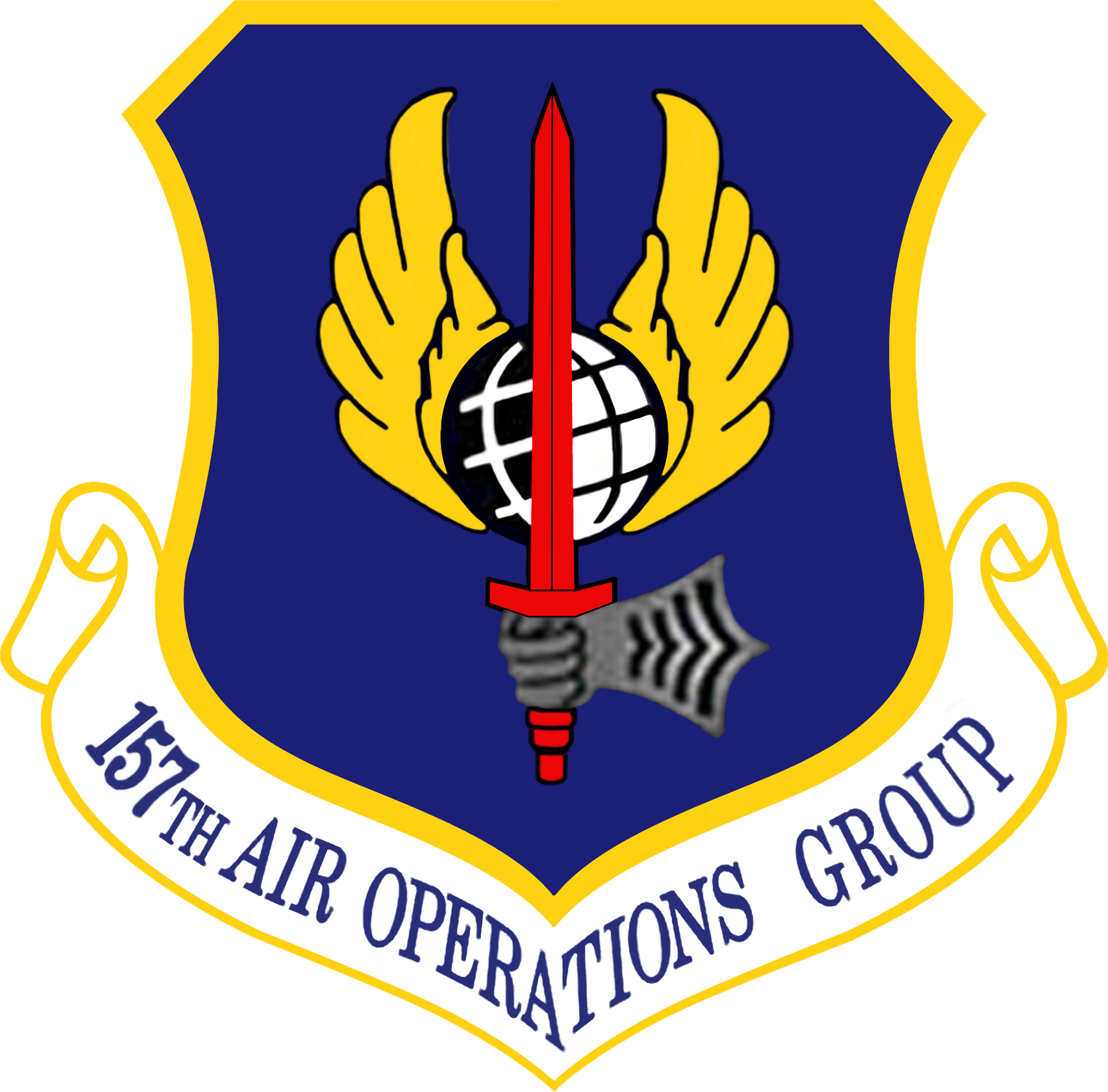
- 157th Air Operations Group – Jefferson Barracks, St Louis, Missouri (Missouri Air National Guard)
- 183d Air Operations Group Capital Airport ANGS, Springfield, Illinois (Illinois Air National Guard)
- 201st Air Operations Group - JB Pearl Harbor-Hickam, Hawaii (Hawaii Air National Guard)
- 217th Air Operations Group – Kellogg ANGB, Battle Creek, Michigan (Michigan Air National Guard)
- 321st Air Mobility Operations Squadron – Travis AFB, California (Air Mobility Command)
- 349th Air Mobility Operations Squadron – Travis AFB, California (Air Force Reserve Command)
- 514th Air Mobility Operations Squadron – McGuire AFB, New Jersey (Air Force Reserve Command)
- 621st Air Mobility Operations Squadron – McGuire AFB, New Jersey (Air Mobility Command)
- 701st Combat Operations Squadron – March ARB, California (Air Force Reserve Command)
  - In addition to its augmentation role to PACAF's 607 AOC at Osan AB, South Korea, the 701 COS established its own AOC facility in the former Southwest Air Defense Sector at March ARB (established 2004)
- 710th Combat Operations Squadron – Langley AFB, Virginia (Air Force Reserve Command)

== NATO CAOC ==
Since July 2013 The North Atlantic Treaty Organization (NATO) also uses the Combined Air Operations Centre concept at two locations (Torrejon, Spain and Uedem, Germany) with a deployable Air Operations Centre at Poggio Renatico, Italy. Previously, supporting the air component commands were 5 static Combined Air Operations Centres (CAOCs) to direct NATO air operations: in Finderup, Denmark; Eskişehir, Turkey; Larissa, Greece; Torrejon, Spain and Lisbon, Portugal. There were 2 further CAOCs with a static as well as a deployable role; Uedem, Germany and Poggio Renatico. The static CAOCs can support Allied air operations from their fixed locations, while the deployable CAOC will move where they are needed.

== See also ==
- Theater Battle Management Core Systems
- Global Command and Control System – U.S. military decision support system
- Air Force Command and Control Integration Center
- Joint Electronics Type Designation System – Unclassified designation system for United States military electronic equipment
- List of military electronics of the United States
