= 710th Combat Operations Squadron =

710th Combat Operations Squadron

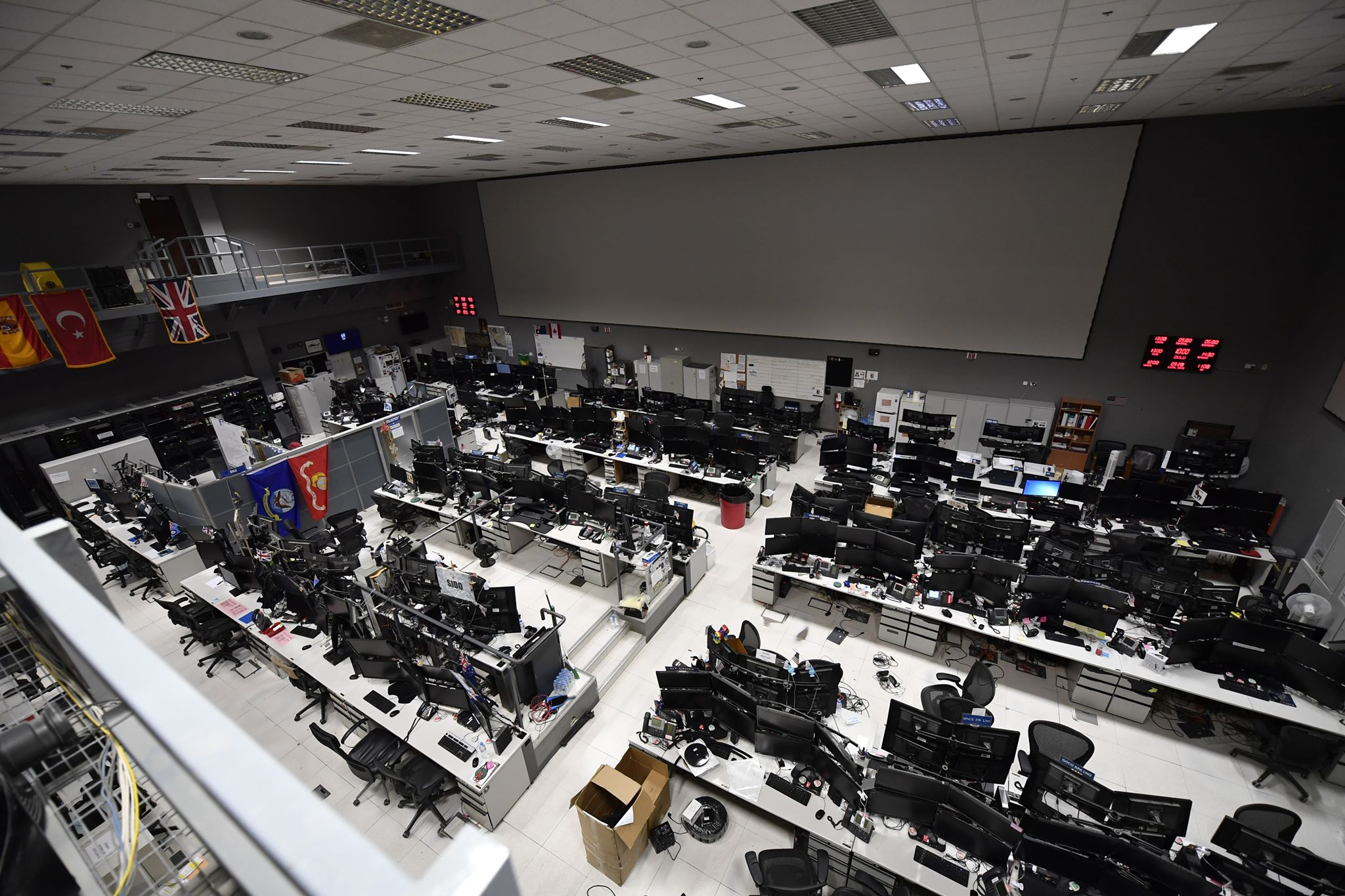
- The Operations Floor of the 609th AOC, the primary unit the 710th COS supports.
- Active: 1952–1983; 2004-present
- Country: United States
- Branch: United States Air Force
- Role: Air Operations
- Size: 130 personnel (Note: The squadron's complement includes a combination of reservists, active guard reservists, Air Reserve technicians, Department of Defense civilians, and contractors.)
- Part of: Air Force Reserve Command
- Garrison/HQ: Joint Base Langley-Eustis, Virginia
- Nickname(s): The Gryphons
- Motto(s): Primus Nuntius (Latin for 'First Notice') (1952-1983)
- Mascot(s): A Gryphon
- Decorations: Air Force Outstanding Unit Award

Commanders
- Current commander: Colonel Ulla A. Kaartti

Insignia
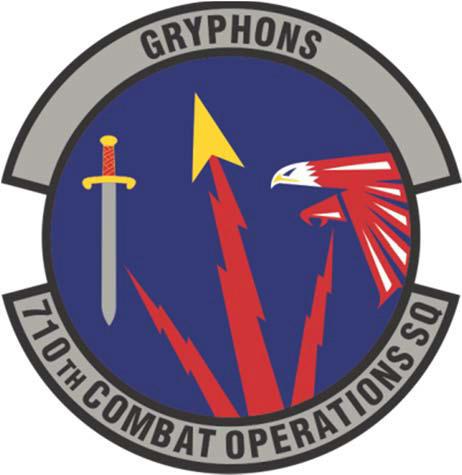
- 710th Combat Operations Squadron Emblem (Note: Approved 11 July 2005.)

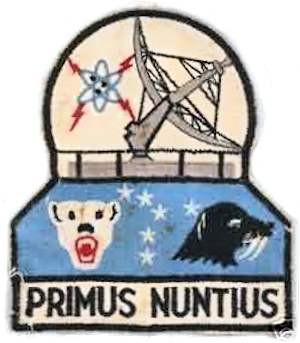
- Patch with 710th Aircraft Control and Warning Squadron emblem

The 710th Combat Operations Squadron is a reserve unit, stationed at Joint Base Langley-Eustis, Virginia, where it has augmented the 610th Air Operations Center since its activation in March 2004. Its first predecessor was established in Alaska in 1952 as the 710th Aircraft Control and Warning Squadron and provided air defense radar coverage until inactivating in 1983. The two squadrons were consolidated in June 2004.

== Mission ==
The mission of the 710th Combat Operations Squadron at Joint Base Langley-Eustis, Virginia, is to provide trained, combat mission-ready air operations center warriors to the United States Central Command Combined Forces Air Component Commander. The 710thS is aligned with U.S. Air Forces, Central Command. When deployed, squadron members provide continuity and expertise to augment the active duty air operations center force.

== History ==
=== Cold War ===
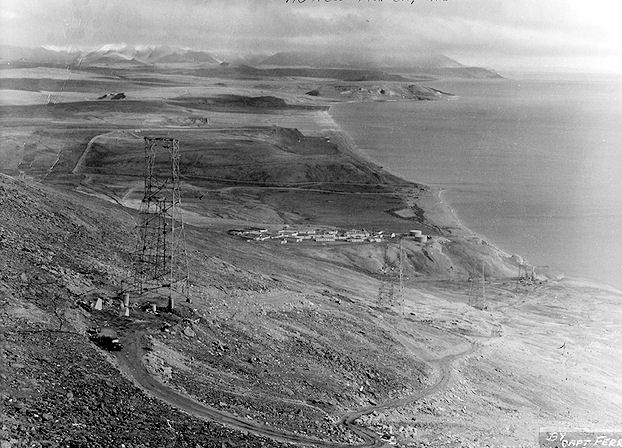
Tin City Air Force Station, Alaska

The 710th Aircraft Warning and Control Squadron was activated on 8 December 1952 at Cape Prince of Wales Air Force Station and assigned to the 160th Aircraft Control and Warning Group, a Washington Air National Guard unit that had been mobiized for the Korean War in 1951 and deployed too Alaska in 1951 to help establish an aircraft warning system there. The 160th was returned to state control in February 1943, and the 710th was transferred to the 548th Aircraft Control and Warning Group, a regular unit that had absorbed the 160th's mission, personnel, and equipment. The squadron operated the radars at one of the ten original sites constructed in Alaska for air defense.

The squadron initially operated an AN/FPS-3 radar, which was upgraded to a later version AN/FPS-20A in 1958 and later replaced by an improved AN/FPS-93A, (Note: These radars were basically the same, but the newer models had improved altitude performance and electronic countermeasures.) to gather information, which it transmitted to the direction center at Murphy /dome Air Force Station. In 1983, these were replaced by an AN/FPS-117 minimally attended radar. As this system became operational, the squadron was inactivated and replaced by a small number of contractors.

=== Global War on Terror ===
The 710th Combat Operations Squadron was activated on 1 March 2004 at Langley Air Force Base, Virginia. A little over two months later, it was consolidated with the 710th Aircraft Warning and Control Squadron. The squadron is one of Air Force Reserve Command's two air operations center augmentation units. It operates the AN/USQ-163 Air Operations Center weapon system, the senior element of the theater air control system. It provides the Combined Forces Air Component Commander with the capability to plan, task, execute and assess airpower and space power to support the Combined Force commander's campaign plan.

Although the squadron does not have campaign participation credit as a unit, its personnel have participated in Operation Enduring Freedom, Operation Iraqi Freedom, Operation New Dawn, Operation Inherent Resolve, and Operation Freedom Sentinel. It also routinely supports military exercises, including Ardent Sentry (an annual homeland security exercise), Austere Challenge (a combined exercise with the United Kingdom, Germany and Israel), Blue Flag, Eager Lion, Eagle Resolve (a multi nation exercise in the Persian Gulf region), Red Flag, Key Resolve, Neptune Falcon (a bomber/tanker interoperability exercise), Pacific Sentry (a joint exercise in the Pacific), Terminal Fury (exercise of army units operating vessels to respond to emergencies), Ulchi-Freedom Guardian, and Virtual Flag (a battle management exercise).

The 710th's Detachment 1 was activated on 1 September 2017 at Shaw Air Force Base, South Carolina to act as a partner of the 609th Air Operations Center and Air Forces Central through the 609th Air Operations Center's Detachment 1.

== Lineage ==
710th Aircraft Control and Warning Squadron

- Constituted as the 710th Aircraft Control and Warning Squadron on 3 November 1952

Activated on 8 December 1952
Inactivated on 1 November 1983

- Consolidated with the 710th Combat Operations Squadron as the 710th Combat Operations Squadron on 3 June 2004

710th Combat Operations Squadron

- Constituted as the 710th Combat Operations Squadron on 6 February 2004

Activated on 1 March 2004

- Consolidated with the 710th Aircraft Control and Warning Squadron on 3 June 2004

=== Assignments ===
- 160th Aircraft Control and Warning Group, 8 December 1952
- 548th Aircraft Control and Warning Group, 1 February 1953
- 11th Air Division, 8 April 1953
- 5060th Aircraft Control and Warning Group, 1 November 1957
- 11th Air Division, 1 October 1959
- 5070th Air Defense Wing, 1 August 1960
- Alaskan Air Command, 1 October 1961
- 531st Aircraft Control and Warning Group (later 11th Tactical Control Group), 15 November 1977 – 1 November 1983
- 610th Regional Support Group, 1 March 2004
- 610th Air Operations Group, c. 1 April 2016 – present

=== Stations ===
- Cape Prince of Wales Air Force Station (later Tin City Air Force Station, Alaska, 8 December 1952 – 1 November 1983
- Langley Air Force Base (later Joint Base Langley-Eustis), Virginia, 1 March 2004 – present

=== Subordinate establishments ===
- Detachment 1, 710th Combat Operations Squadron, 1 September 2017 – present

=== Awards and campaigns ===
Award streamer	Award	Dates	Notes
	Air Force Outstanding Unit Award	1 January–30 November 1977	710th Aircraft Control and Warning Squadron
	Air Force Outstanding Unit Award	1 January–31 December 1978	710th Aircraft Control and Warning Squadron
	Air Force Outstanding Unit Award	1 July 1982–[1] November 1983	710th Aircraft Control and Warning Squadron
	Air Force Outstanding Unit Award	1 August 2004–31 July 2006	710th Combat Operations Squadron
