= 624th Operations Center =

Inactive unit of the U.S. Air Force

624th Operations Center

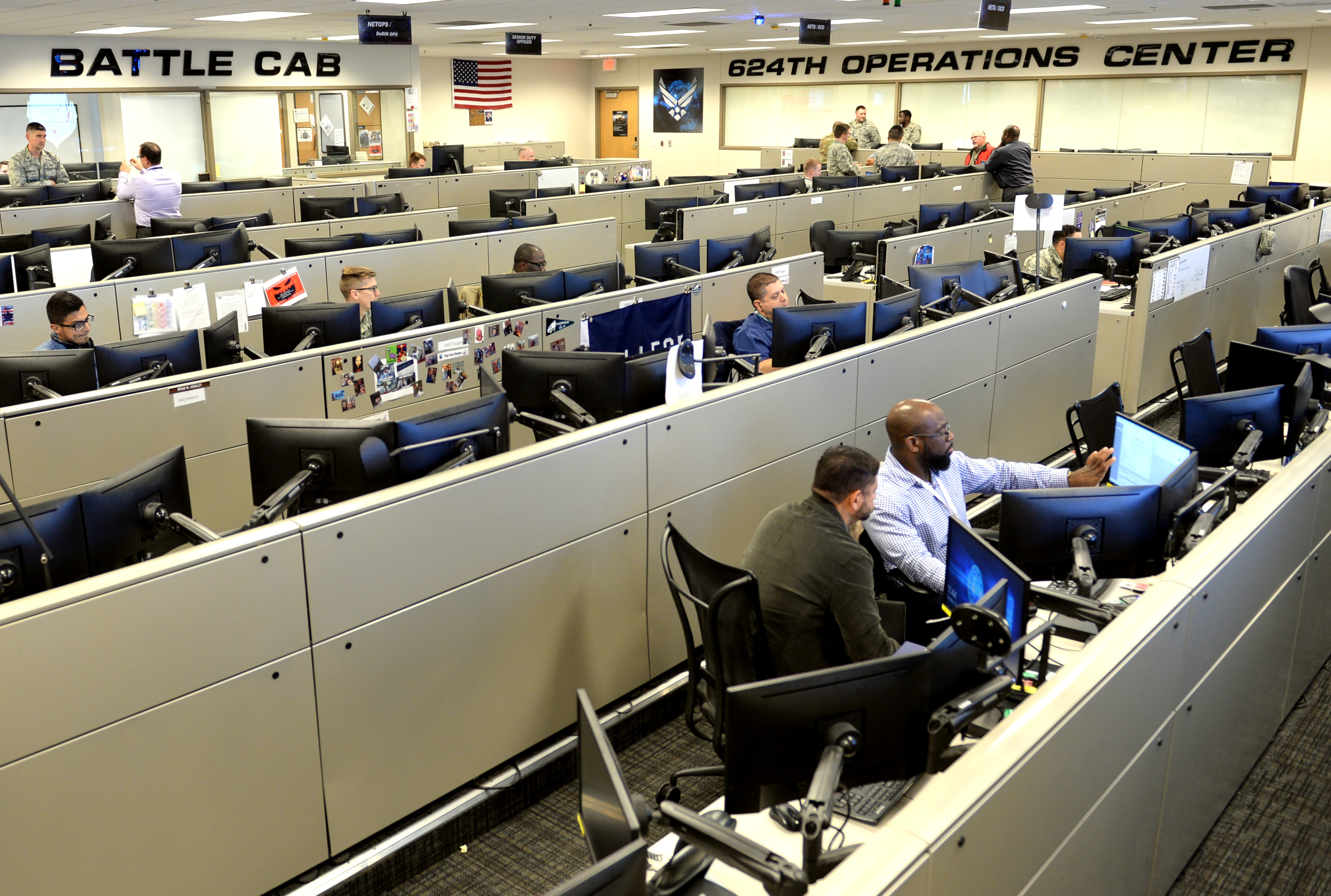
- Airmen of the 624th Operations Center in 2018
- Active: 1 June 1948 – 13 April 1992; 18 August 2009 – 16 March 2020
- Country: United States
- Branch: United States Air Force
- Part of: Air Combat Command: Sixteenth Air Force
- Garrison/HQ: Joint Base San Antonio, Texas
- Decorations: Navy Meritorious Unit Commendation Air Force Outstanding Unit Award

Insignia
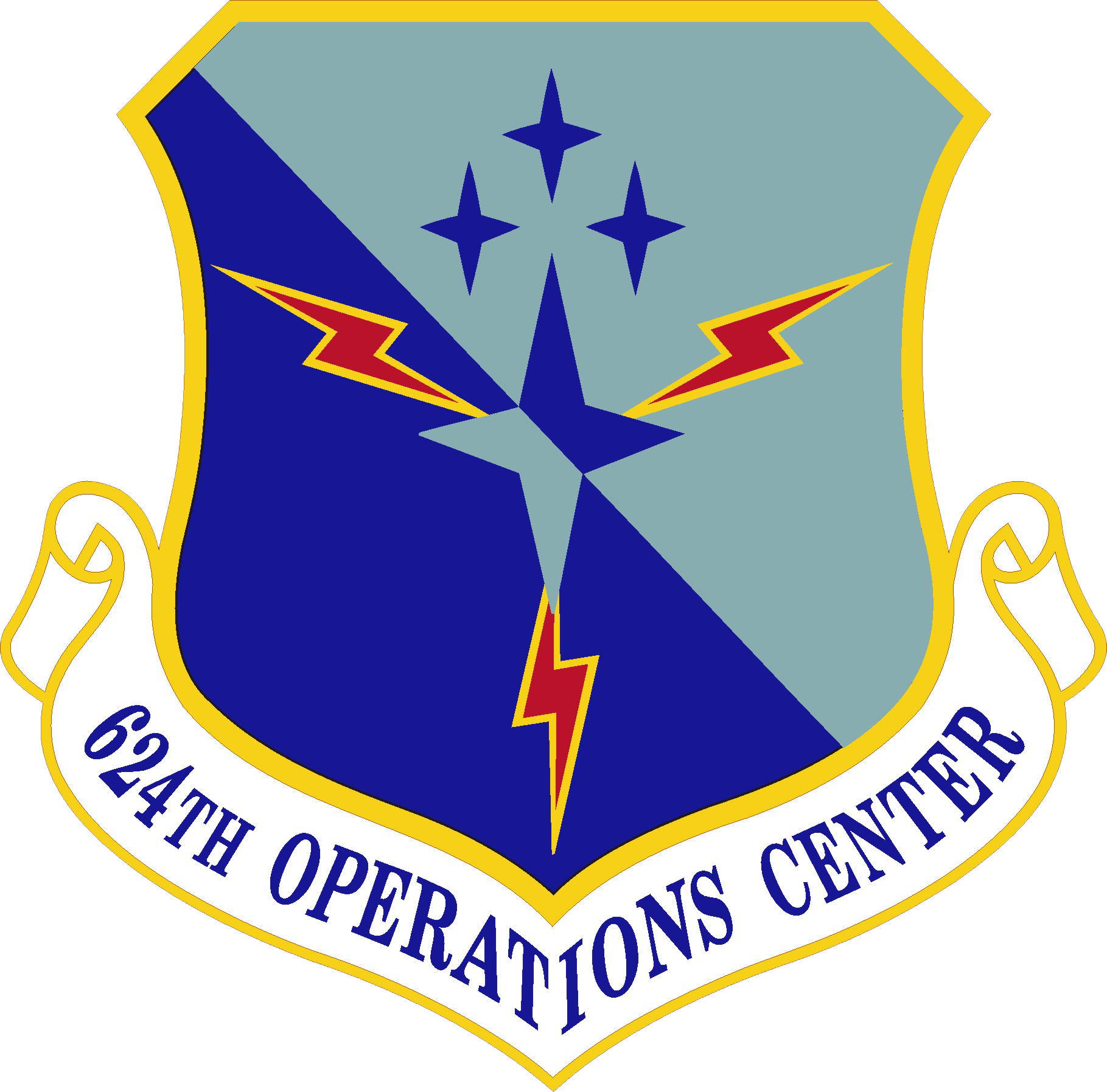
- 624th Operations Center emblem

The 624th Operations Center (624 OC) is an inactive unit of the United States Air Force. It was inactivated on 16 March 2020 and last located at Joint Base San Antonio, Texas, with its responsibilities transferred to the newly activated 616th Operations Center. Prior to its inactivation, it served as the Sixteenth Air Force's operational arm to provide a robust full-spectrum and integrated cyberspace operations capability. The 624 OC interfaced with theater and functional Air Operations Centers to establish, plan, direct, coordinate, assess, and command & control cyber operations in support of AF and Joint war fighting requirements.

== Components ==
- Intelligence, Surveillance and Reconnaissance Division (ISRD)
- Strategy Division (SRD)
- Combat Plans Division (CPD)
- Combat Operations Division (COD)
- Cyber Coordination Cell (CRC)
- Air Communications Division (ACOMD)

== History ==
On 20 August 2009, the Secretary of the Air Force issued a letter announcing the re-alignment of Air Force Cyberspace activities. The letter announced the inactivation of the 608th Air Force Network Operations Center, and activation of the 624th Operations Center. In addition, the new 624th Operations Center would report to Twenty-Fourth Air Force, Air Force Space Command (a change of reporting from Eighth Air Force, Air Combat Command).

A new emblem for the unit was posted to the website of The Institute of Heraldry on 23 April 2012.

The 624th Operations Center was inactivated on 16 March 2020 alongside the 625th Operations Center in a ceremony at Joint Base San Antonio that also activated the newly formed 616th Operations Center, tasked to take over the responsibilities of the two inactivated units.

== Lineage ==
- Designated as 145th Airways and Air Communications Service Squadron on 14 May 1948

Organized on 1 June 1948
Redesignated as 1957th Airways and Air Communications Service Squadron on 1 October 1948
Redesignated as 1957th Airways and Air Communications Service Group on 18 September 1959
Redesignated as Headquarters, 1957th Airways and Air Communications Service Group on 8 October 1959
Redesignated as Headquarters, 1957th Communications Group on 1 July 1961
Redesignated as 1957th Information Systems Group on 1 August 1984
Redesignated as 1957th Communications Group on 1 November 1986
Inactivated on 13 April 1992

- Redesignated as 624th Operations Center on 11 August 2009

Activated on 18 August 2009
Inactivated on 16 March 2020

=== Assignments ===
- 71st Airways and Air Communications Service Group, 1 June 1948
- 1810th Airways and Air Communications Service Group, 1 October 1948
- Pacific Communications Area, 1 November 1957
- 1957th Airways and Air Communications (later, 1957th Communications) Group, 8 October 1959
- Pacific Communications Area (later, Pacific Communications Division; Pacific Information Systems Division; Pacific Communications Division), 8 November 1959
- 15th Air Base Wing, 1 October 1990 – 13 April 1992
- Twenty-Fourth Air Force, 18 August 2009 – 11 October 2019
- Sixteenth Air Force, 11 October 2019 – 16 March 2020

=== Stations ===
- Hickam Air Force Base, Hawaii, 1 June 1948 – 13 April 1992
- Lackland Air Force Base (later, Joint Base San Antonio), Texas, 18 August 2009 – 16 March 2020

== Decorations ==
- Navy Meritorious Unit Commendation: 1 January 1968 – 26 July 1969
- Air Force Outstanding Unit Awards: 1 February – 30 November 1962; 1 January 1966 – 31 December 1967; 1 July 1989 – 30 June 1991; 1 November 2012 – 31 October 2014

== See also ==
- Air Operations Center
