= 727th Expeditionary Air Control Squadron =

United States air control squadron

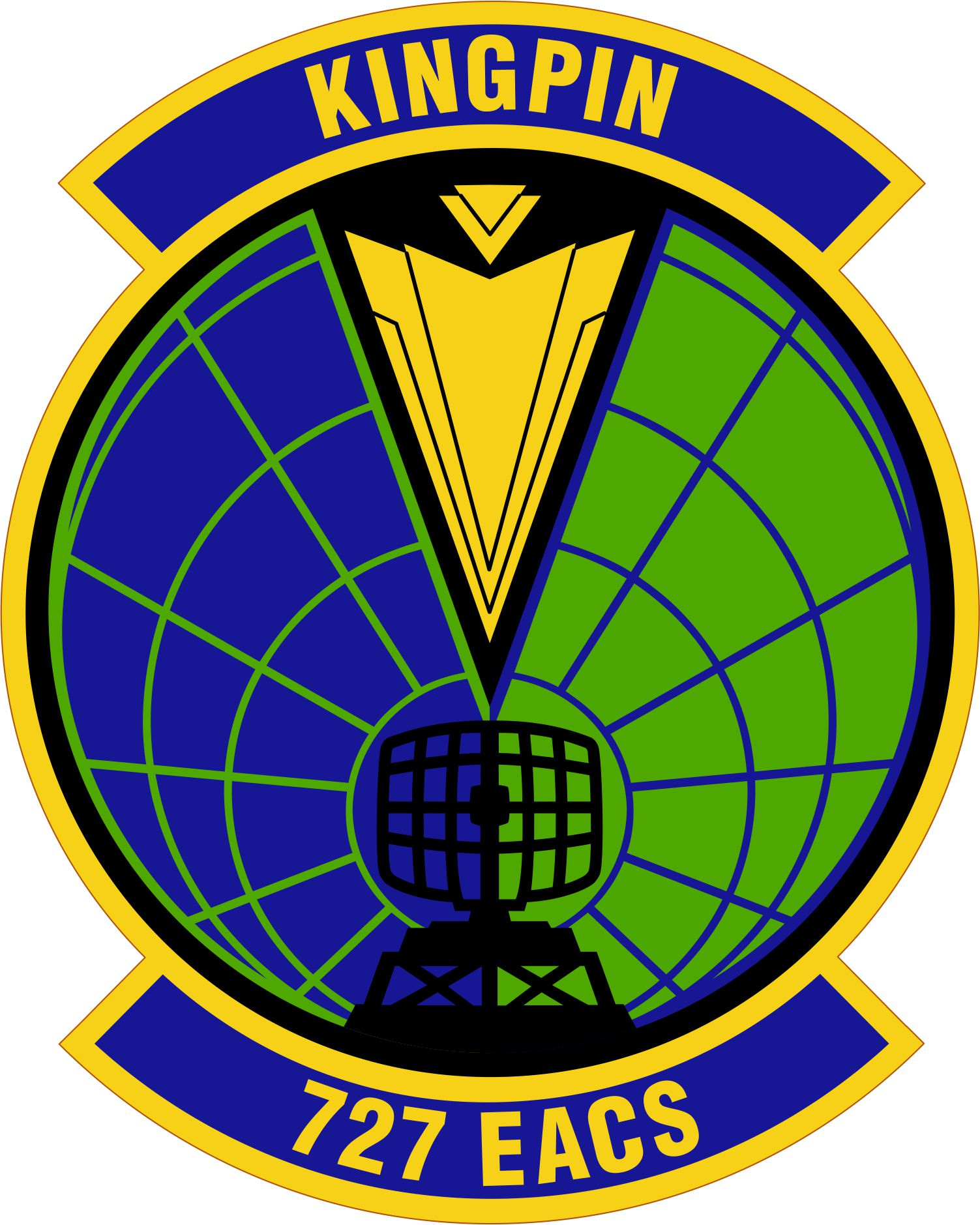
- Active: 30 August 1950 - 1 Oct 1995 3 Feb 2005 - Present
- Country: USA
- Branch: United States Air Force
- Type: Air Control Squadron
- Role: Battle Management, Command and Control
- Part of: Nineth Air Force (Air Forces Central)
- Garrison/HQ: Shaw Air Force Base, SC; Southwest Asia
- Motto: Always in Control
- Mascot: Kingpin
- Engagements: Operation Iraqi Freedom Operation New Dawn Operation Freedom Sentinel Operation Inherent Resolve Operation Resolute Support Twelve Day War

Commanders
- Current commander: Lt Col Wade Doss

The 727th Expeditionary Air Control Squadron (727 EACS), callsign "Kingpin," is a United States Air Force tactical air control squadron that provides command and control (C2), battle management, real-time radar surveillance, and air domain awareness as part of Air Forces Central for the United States Central Command (USCENTCOM) area of responsibility. Supported missions include the combined defense of the Arabian Peninsula and Operation Inherent Resolve by directing tactical aircraft deconfliction, close air support, air interdiction and integrated air and missile defense. It uses a "system of systems," to include TPS-75 radars and Link 16, to control airspace, ensuring persistent safety of flight and combat identification and engagement for mission success of joint and coalition forces.

== History ==
=== 2003: The Beginning in Iraq ===
The 727th Expeditionary Air Control Squadron (EACS) commenced combat operations during the onset of Operation Iraqi Freedom (OIF) in March 2003. The unit was the first tactical air control organization to organically function within the confines of Iraqi airspace. The squadron's mission primarily focused on providing command-and-control (C2) capabilities for joint and coalition aircraft across a vast operational area, including delivery of real-time radar surveillance for combat identification, and managing airspace deconfliction for thousands of fixed and rotary wing sorties.

Operating out of Balad Air Base, later known as Joint Base Balad, the 727 EACS effectively leveraged TPS-75 radar technologies to play a critical role integrating between air and surface fires throughout the coalition's movements in and around the greater Baghdad area.

=== 2004-2005: Expanding Command and Control ===
As coalition air operations escalated, the 727 EACS broadened operational impacts beyond Balad Air Base. The squadron forward-deployed a full radar suite to provide support for forward operations at Kirkuk Air Base, Qayyarah West, and Mosul, to ensure continuous radar and communications coverage across northern and central Iraq. Additionally, the unit validated mobile control capabilities at provisional and austere sites to refine overall sustainment requirements. The 727 EACS' integration with E-3 Airborne Warning and Control System (AWACS) and E-8C Joint Surveillance Target Attack Radar System (JSTARS) assets integrated growing command and control responsibilities in the management of close-air support (CAS), intelligence, surveillance, and reconnaissance (ISR), as well as refueling missions.

=== 2006: Enduring Operations and Enhanced Joint Integration ===
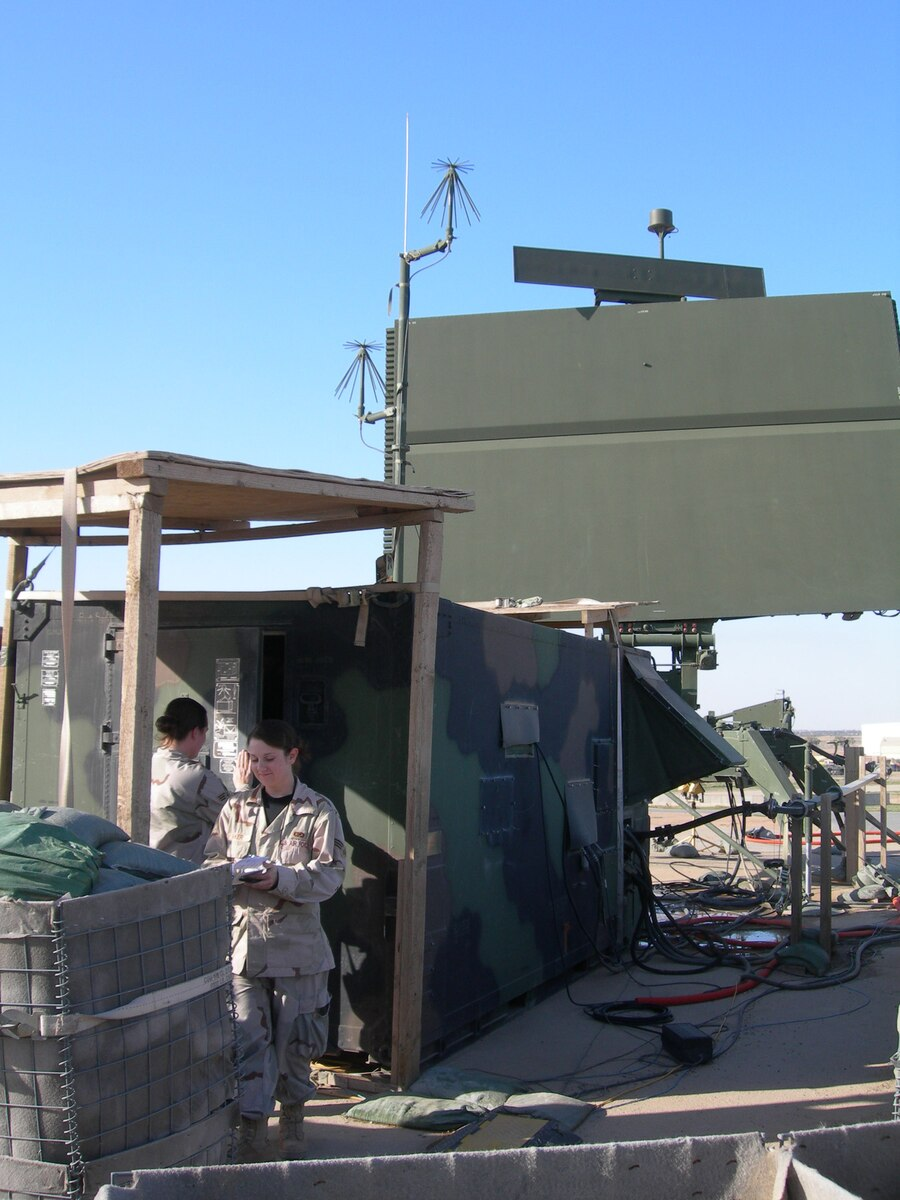
727 EACS TPS-75 Radar at JB Balad.

During a single deployment rotation (6 months), the squadron battle managed over 166,000 aircraft while overseeing airspace that spanned more than 277,000 square miles through its decentralized execution teams forward-deployed to Kirkuk, Mosul, and now Tallil. This provided comprehensive air control coverage throughout the entirety of Operation Iraqi Freedom. The squadron collaborated extensively with other Theater Air Control Systems (TACS), such as Joint Terminal Attack Controllers (JTACs), E-8C JSTARS, E-3 AWACS, and the Combined Air Operations Center, as well as joint ground force units in order to expedite the increased demand for air support.

=== 2007-2008: C2 Infrastructure and Tactical Resilience ===
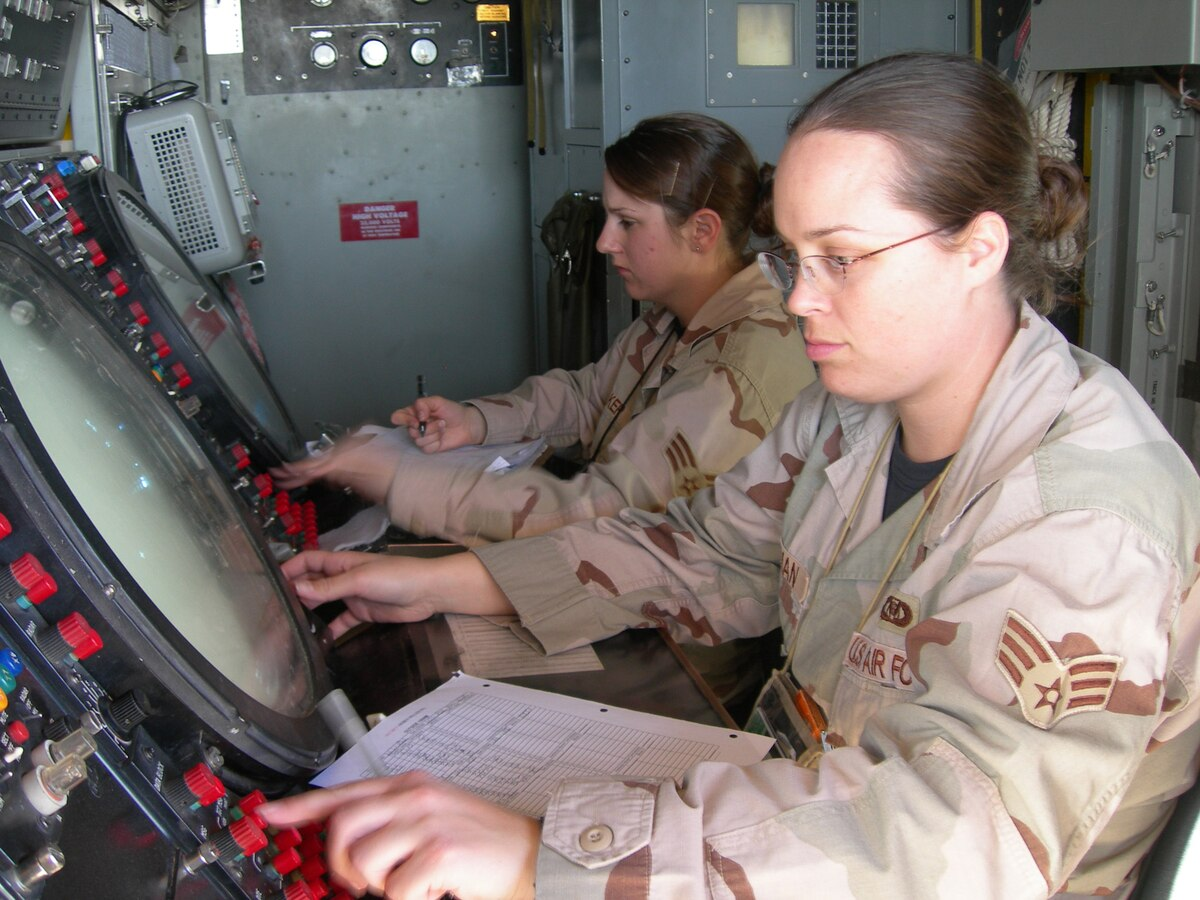
727 EACS Balad Airmen

In response to the persistent need for effective air control, the unit fortified its infrastructure at Balad by constructing fortified shelters for radar systems, communications, and operational activities. Detachments rotated through Kirkuk, Mosul, and Tallil, where they continued to support deployed AN/TPS-75 radar systems and modular control shelters. These forward teams maintained decentralized command and control, enabling real-time mission coordination and surveillance operations closer to the front lines of troops in contact. Memorial observances, such as those commemorating SSgt Patrick Lee Griffin Jr., continued to represent the vitality of squadron operations.

=== 2009-2011: OIF Drawdown and Redeployment ===
During the drawdown of Operation Iraqi Freedom, the 727 EACS transitioned support to Operation NEW DAWN, ensuring consistent and secure battle management of the airspace. As coalition forces shifted to an advisory capacity, the unit continued to provide tactical air control. The squadron's responsibilities included coordinating intelligence, surveillance, and reconnaissance (ISR) missions in identifying threats posed to forces now with limited offensive rules of engagement, facilitating medical evacuation (MEDEVAC) operations, and delivering immediate close air support (CAS). In December 2011, with the transition of OIF to Operation NEW DAWN, the 727 EACS officially redeployed, signifying the conclusion of its operational presence in Iraq.

=== 2012-2021: Regional Detachments and the Al Dhafra Hub ===
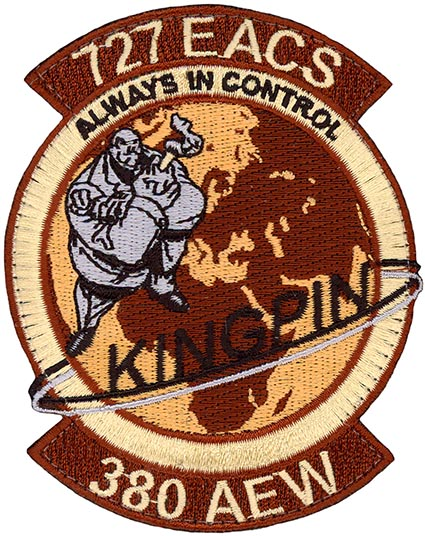
727 EACS Al Dhafra Patch

Following redeployment from Iraq, the squadron was reassigned a new main operating location in the United Arab Emirates (UAE). From Al Dhafra Air Base, the 727 EACS primarily supported contingency air operations across the Persian Gulf, the Strait of Hormuz, and the Gulf of Oman.

In August 2014, the 727 EACS controlled all joint and combined air component forces accountabiity into and out of Iraq and Syria for airstrikes against the Islamic State. After the establishment of Combined Jonit Task Force - Operation Inherent Resolve (CJTF-OIR) in October 2014, radar detachments forward deployed to Qatar, Kuwait, and Iraq in direct support against ISIS threats. Remote radar sites in Afghanistan soon followed with the mission realignment of the theater air control system, providing surveillance and airspace control support for Operation FREEDOM'S SENTINEL and NATO Operation RESOLUTE SUPPORT.

=== 2021-Present: Shaw AFB and Modernized Theater Operations ===
On April 20, 2021, the 727 EACS transitioned its main operations center to Shaw Air Force Base, South Carolina, as part of a larger restructuring under Air Forces Central, to include operational realignment, now subordinate to the 609th Air Operations Center. This change synchronized operations with senior echelon command elements and enhanced the 727 EACS' survivability to provide distributed theater-wide command and control and battle management.

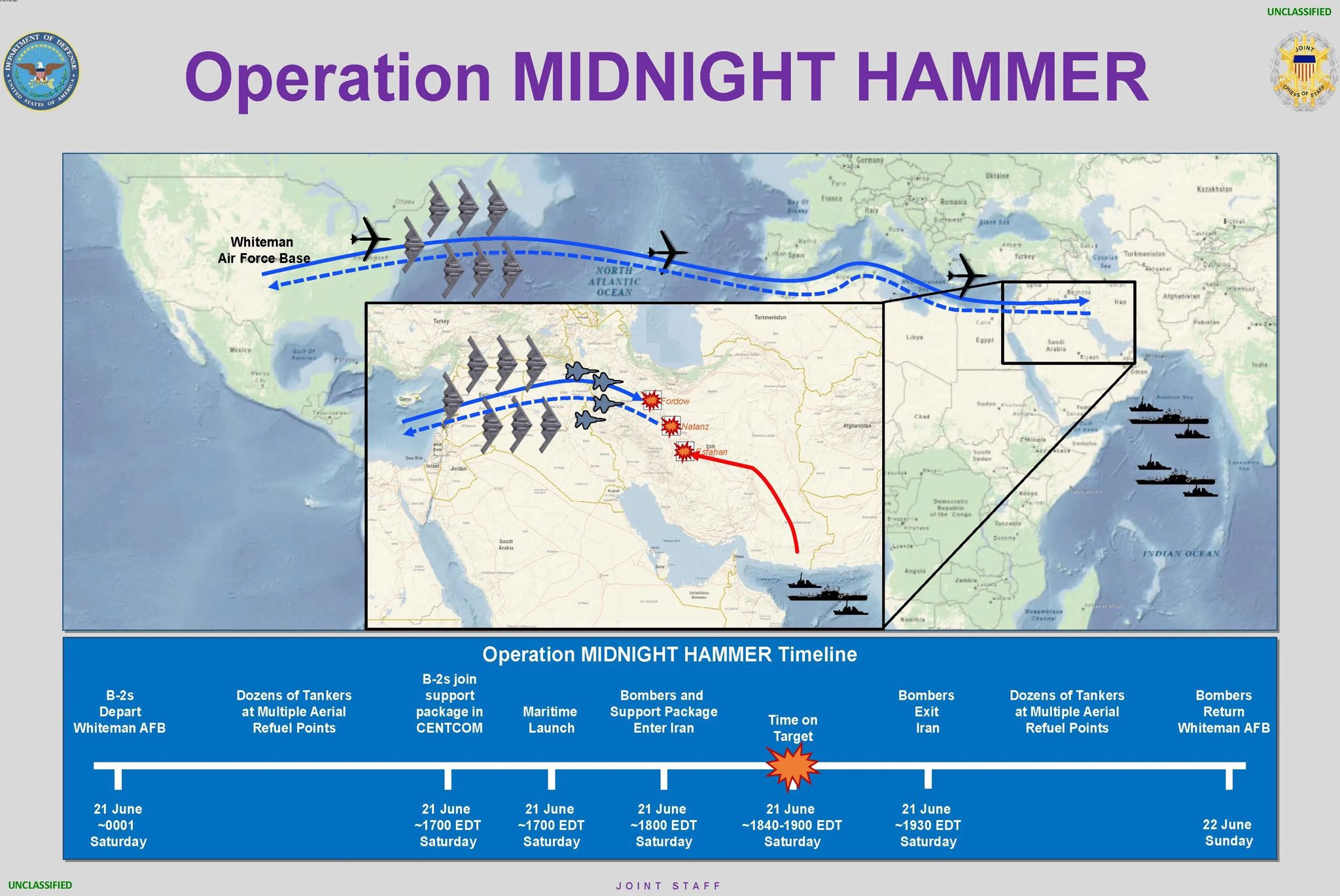
Operation Midnight Hammer

In June 2025, the 727 EACS provided tactical air control for hundreds of defensive counter-air sorties and threat awareness against Iranian one-way attack drones and theater ballistic missiles as part of the Twelve-Day War. The unit was accountable for all air domain awareness, to include fighter, bomber, ISR, and tanker aircraft, ultimately culminating in Operation MIDNIGHT HAMMER and the subsequent retaliatory Defense of Qatar.

== Lineage ==
- Constituted on 30 August 1950 as the 727 Aircraft Control and Warning Squadron.
- Activated on 2 September 1950.
- Redesignated: 727 Tactical Control Squadron on 1 Jul 1964; 727 Tactical Control Squadron (Test) on 15 Sep 1979; 727 Air Control Squadron (Test) on 1 November 1991.
- Inactivated on 1 October 1995.
- Redesignated on 3 February 2005 as the 727 Expeditionary Air Control Squadron and converted to provisional status.

== Stations ==
- Shaw AFB, SC: 2 September 1950
- Myrtle Beach AFB, SC: 26 September 1954
- Bergstrom AFB, TX: 15 November 1966
- Eglin AF Aux Field #9 (Hurlburt Field): 1 October 1979 – 1 October 1995.
- Southwest Asia: 20 March 2003 - 21 April 2021
- Shaw AFB, SC (+Southwest Asia Detachments): 22 April 2021 – Present

== Unit Decorations ==
- Meritorious Unit Awards: Every year since 2005 (21 total as of 2026)
- Air Force Outstanding Unit Awards: 14 Oct 1954; 1 Aug 1961-1 Aug 1963; 2 Aug-31 Dec 1963; 1 Jan 1972-31 Dec 1973; 1 Jul 1981-30 Jun 1983; 1 Jul 1984-30 Jun 1986; 1 Jul 1986-30 Jun 1988; 1 Jan 1990-31 Dec 1991; 1 Jan 1992-30 Jun 1993; 1 Jul 1993-30 Jun 1994; 1 Jul 1994-30 Jun 1995.
