= 157th Air Operations Group =

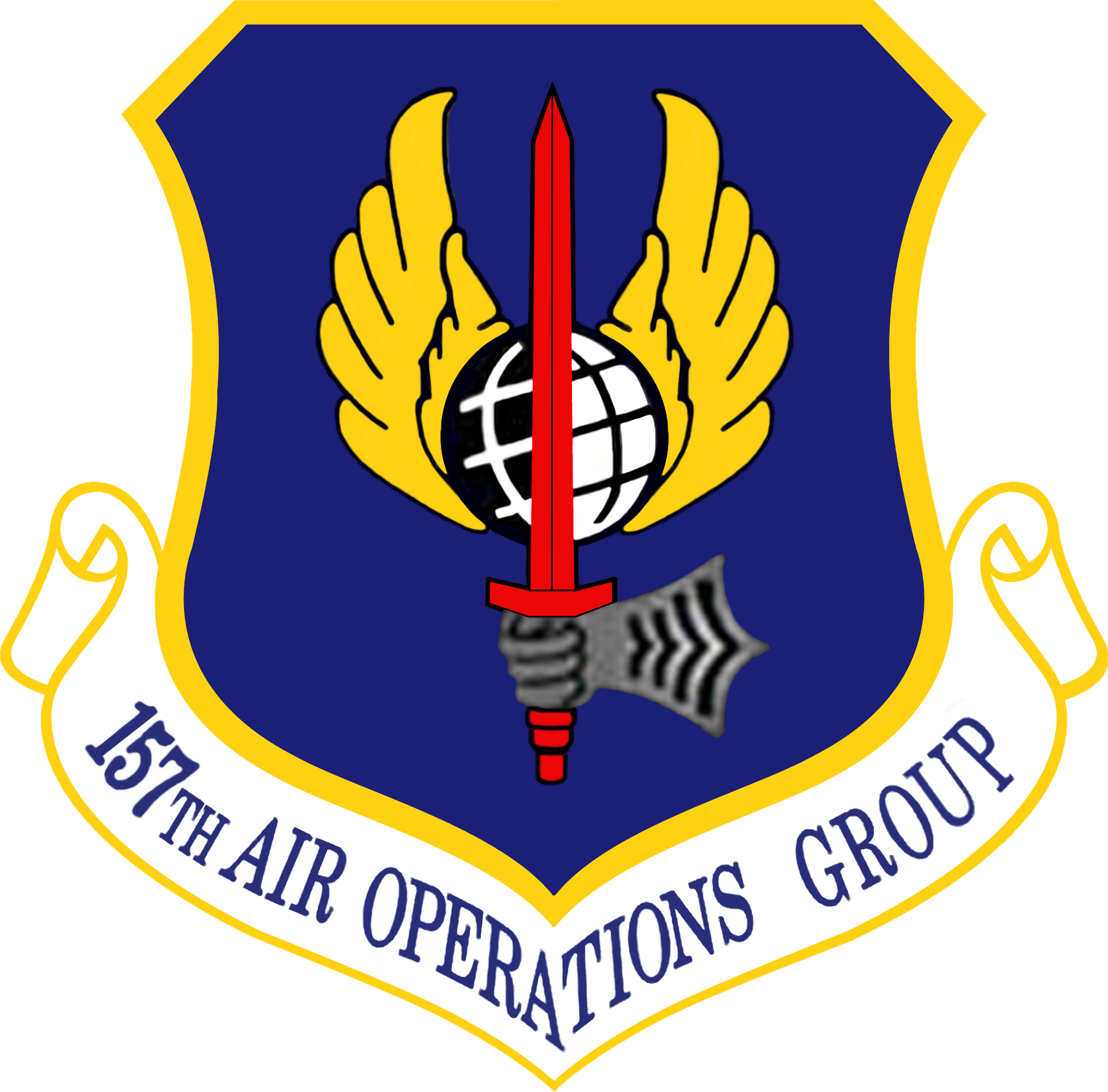
- 157th Air Operations Group emblem
- Active: 1944–1945; 1948–1952; 1952–present
- Country: United States
- Branch: United States Air Force
- Garrison/HQ: Jefferson Barracks, Missouri
- Engagements: Mediterranean Theater of Operations; European Theater of Operations

The United States Air Force's 157th Air Operations Group is an Air Operations Center manning unit located at Jefferson Barracks National Guard Base in St Louis, Missouri. The unit is geographically separated from its supporting unit, the Missouri Air National Guard's 131st Bomb Wing.

== Mission ==
The 157 Air Operations Group responds to operational requirements within the Headquarters Pacific Air Forces (HQ PACAF) area of responsibility, which covers an area from the east coast of Africa to the west coast of the Americas.

== Operations ==
The group mans an Air Operations Center (AOC), the senior element of the Theater Air Control System using the AN/USQ-163 Falconer. An AOC is the command and control center that plans, executes and assesses aerospace operations during a contingency or conflict.

The AOC plans and executes missions by theater aerospace forces for Joint Forces Air Component Commanders. (Note: When a Commander, Air Force Forces is also the Joint Forces Air Component Commander in a theater, the AOC is also the Joint Air Operations Center. In cases of multinational operations, the AOC becomes a Combined Aerospace Operations Center.) The AOC enables Joint Forces Air Component Commanders to exercise command and control of aerospace forces in support of a Joint Force Commander. An AOC consists of a large number of related systems which interoperate to plan, conduct, and monitor the air and space war.

== History ==
=== World War II ===
The 157th Air Operations Group was first organized in the Signal Corps on 15 January 1944 as the 582d Signal Aircraft Warning Battalion. The battalion served in the Mediterranean and European Theater of Operations as an element of Twelfth and Ninth Air Forces.

The battalion was organized in Italy, primarily from elements of the provisional 2691 Signal Aircraft Warning Battalion (Mobile) and 732d through 734th Signal Aircraft Warning Companies that had been attached to it, which were simultaneously disbanded. The battalion operations were conducted by radar operating detachments, which frequently moved. Elements of the battalion participated in Operation Dragoon, the invasion of southern France. Following V-E Day, the battalion remained in Germany as part of the occupation forces until it was inactivated, along with its component companies, on 7 November 1945. This was a period of personnel turmoil, with most experienced members of the unit being transferred to other units for return to the United States, being replaced by "low point" men who were late arrivals to the theater. On 22 October, the battalion was reduced to nominal strength of one officer and one airman, who were transferred to the 555th Signal Aircraft Warning Battalion when the 582d was inactivated.

=== Air National Guard ===
The battalion was converted to the Air Corps, redesignated the 157th Aircraft Control and Warning Group and allotted to the National Guard in May 1946. It was organized in the Missouri National Guard later that year, but did not receive federal recognition until 1948. The group was mobilized for the Korean War in the fall of 1951 and served at Alexandria Air Force Base, where it was released from active duty on 1 November 1953. It was redesignated the 157th Tactical Control Group in 1952 and its mission changed from air defense to control of tactical strike aircraft.

The group was activated the same day in the Missouri Air National Guard. It became the 157th Air Control Group' in 1992 and the 157th Air Operations Group in 2001. The group's initial mobilization gaining command was Tactical Air Command

In 2016 the 157th Air Operations Group converted from a non-traditional Group -> Division organization into a traditional Group -> Squadron organization. With such, new squadron commanders were designated for the newly established 157 Combat Operations Squadron (COS), 157th Air Intelligence Squadron (AIS), and the 157th Air Communications Squadron (ACOMS). All of which will report to the 157th Air Operations Group Commander.

Also in 2016, the 157th Air Operations Group gained an additive mission set supporting U.S. Air Force Global Strike Command and the 608th Air Operations Center located at Barksdale AFB, LA. Once fully operational, the additive unit will be known as the 257th Combat Operations Flight. The unit's Commander reports directly to the Commander, 157th Air Operations Group.

== Lineage ==
- Constituted as the 582d Signal Aircraft Warning Battalion on 27 November 1943

Activated on 15 January 1944
Inactivated on 30 November 1945

- Converted to the Air Corps, redesignated 157th Aircraft Control and Warning Group and allotted to the National Guard on 24 May 1946

Activated on 22 September 1946
Federally recognized on 26 April 1948

- Called to Federal Service on 1 November 1951
- Redesignated 157th Tactical Control Group on 20 November 1952
- Inactivated and released from Federal Service on 1 November 1953
- Redesignated 157th Air Control Group on 16 June 1992
- Redesignated 157th Air Operations Group on 18 April 2001

=== Assignments ===
- 64th Fighter Wing, 15 January 1944 – 20 November 1945
- 71st Fighter Wing, 26 April 1948
- Missouri Air National Guard, 1 November 1951
- Tenth Air Force, November 1951
- Ninth Air Force, November 1951 – 1 November 1953
- Missouri Air National Guard, 1 November 1953

=== Stations ===
- Frattamaggiore, Italy, 15 January 1944
- San Felice, Italy, 1 June 1944
- Rocca di Palma, Italy, 6 June 1944
- Ortobello, Italy, 19 June 1944
- Santa Maria Airfield, Italy, 21 July 1944
- St Tropez, France, 9 September 1944
- Rosières-aux-Salines, France, 18 November 1944
- Nancy, France, 17 January 1945
- Edenkoben, Germany, 2 April 1945
- Schwäbisch Hall-Hessental Airfield, 29 April 1945 – 20 November 1945
- St Louis, Missouri, 22 September 1946
- Jefferson Barracks, Missouri 1951 – September 1951
- Alexandria Air Force Base, Louisiana, September 1951
- Jefferson Barracks, Missouri October 1951–Present

=== Components ===
- Integral Companies (Headquarters and Plotting Company, Reporting Company A, Reporting Company B, Reporting Company C): 15 January 1944 – 20 November 1945

Squadrons

- 115th Aircraft Control and Warning Squadron: by February 1954 – June 1963, 1963 – c. June 1965
- 117th Tactical Control Squadron: c. 1 August 1965 – c. 15 September 1971
- 119th Tactical Control Squadron (later 119th Tactical Control Flight): 1 September 1965 – 16 June 1992
- 121st Air Control Squadron: 16 June 1992 – 1999
- 122d Aircraft Control and Warning Squadron: 16 October 1946 – 1 November 1951, November 1951 – 1 November 1953
- 123d Aircraft Control and Warning Squadron: 2 November 1953 – December 1958
- 124th Aircraft Control and Warning Squadron: November 1951 – 1 November 1953
- 128th Aircraft Control and Warning Squadron: 2 November 1953 – c. June 1965
- 131st Aircraft Control Squadron (later 131st Tactical Control Squadron): 22 September 1946 – 1 November 1951, November 1951 – 1 November 1953, 1 November 1952 – c. 1 August 1965
- 131st Direct Air Support Squadron: c. 1 August 1965 – s. 7 April 1968
- 132d Aircraft Control and Warning Squadron: 18 December 1947 – May 1951
- 133d Aircraft Control and Warning Squadron (later 133d Aircraft Control and Warning Flight): 22 September 1946 – May 1951, 1 November 1952 – c. April 1958
- 157th Tactical Control Squadron (later 157th Tactical Control Flight): 1972 – c. 1981
- 157th Tactical Air Control Squadron: 30 September 1971 – unknown
- 157th Combat Operations Squadron: 2016–Present
- 157th Air Communications Squadron: 2016–Present
- 157th Air Intelligence Squadron: 2016–Present

Flights

- 110th Tactical Control Flight: 8 October 1971 – unknown
- 112th Aircraft Control and Warning Flight: 1 December 1953 – 1958
- 115th Tactical Control Flight: 15 September 1971 – unknown
- 117th Aircraft Control and Warning Flight: December 1958 – c. 1 August 1965
- 118th Aircraft Control and Warning Flight: December 1958 – unknown
- 119th Aircraft Control and Warning Flight: 1 December 1953 – 1 September 1965
- 119th Tactical Control Flight (see 119th Tactical Control Squadron)
- 128th Tactical Control Flight: 1 September 1965 – 8 February 1974
- 129th Tactical Control Flight: c. 1 March 1965 – 1969
- 133d Aircraft Control and Warning Flight (see 133d Aircraft Control and Warning Squadron)
- 157th Tactical Control Flight (see 157th Tactical Control Squadron)
- 257th Combat Operations Flight; 2017–Present (Air Force Global Strike Command)

=== Gaining Command ===
- Tactical Air Command,
- Pacific Air Forces (1993–Present)
- AF Global Strike Command (257th COF; 2017–Present)

== Weapons Systems Operated ==
- AN/USQ-163 Falconer Air Operations Center (199x-Present)
