= Jefferson Barracks Military Post =

Military post in Missouri, U.S.

Coordinates: 38.49465°N 90.28187°W

- Lemay, Missouri
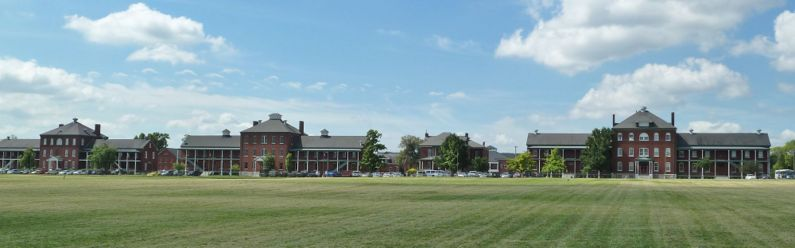
- Jefferson Barracks Red Brick Barrack Buildings.

Site information
- Type: U.S. Military Post
- Controlled by: U.S. Air Force

Site history
- Built: 1826
- In use: 1826–1946

Garrison information
- Garrison: Army National Guard, Air National Guard, Veterans Administration
- Jefferson Barracks Historic District
- U.S. National Register of Historic Places
- U.S. Historic district
- Location within Missouri Location within the United States
- Nearest city: St. Louis County, Missouri
- Area: 337.8 acres (136.7 ha)
- Built: 1826
- Built by: Quartermaster Corps
- Architectural style: Military vernacular
- NRHP reference No.: 72001492
- Added to NRHP: February 1, 1972

The Jefferson Barracks Military Post is located on the Mississippi River at Lemay, Missouri, south of St. Louis. It was an important and active U.S. Army installation from 1826 through 1946. It is the oldest operating U.S. military installation west of the Mississippi River, and it is now used as a base for the Army and Air National Guard. A Veterans Affairs healthcare system campus is located on the southern portion of the base and is also the headquarters for the Veterans Canteen Service.

== History ==
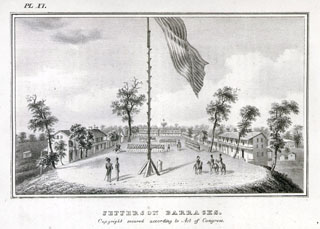
Jefferson Barracks during the Mexican–American War.

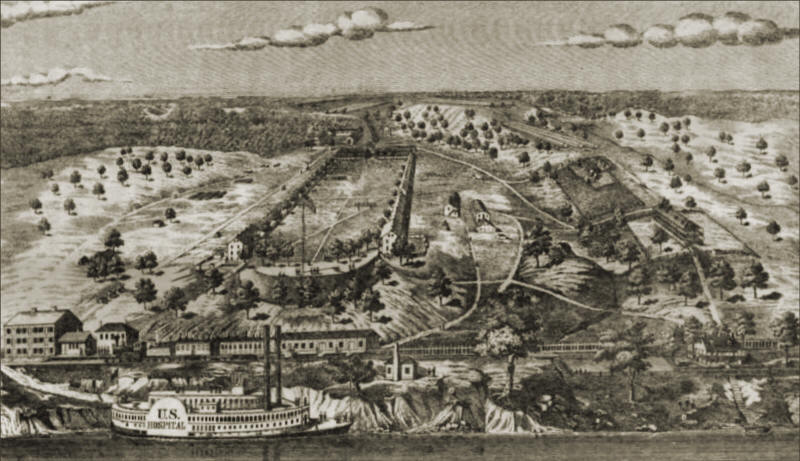
Jefferson Barracks during the Civil War.

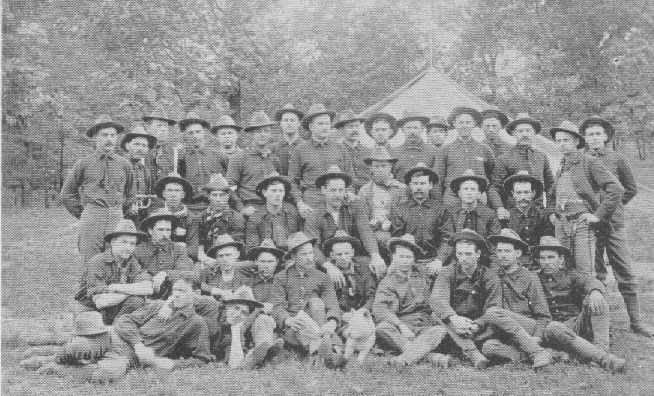
Soldiers of Battery A from Jefferson Barracks.

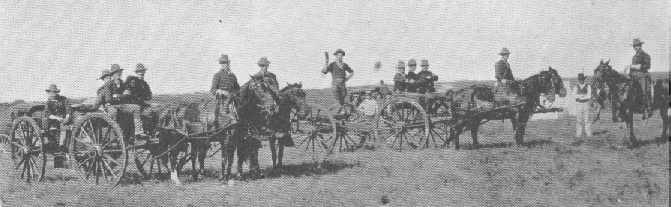
Battery A going to target practice at Guayama, Puerto Rico.

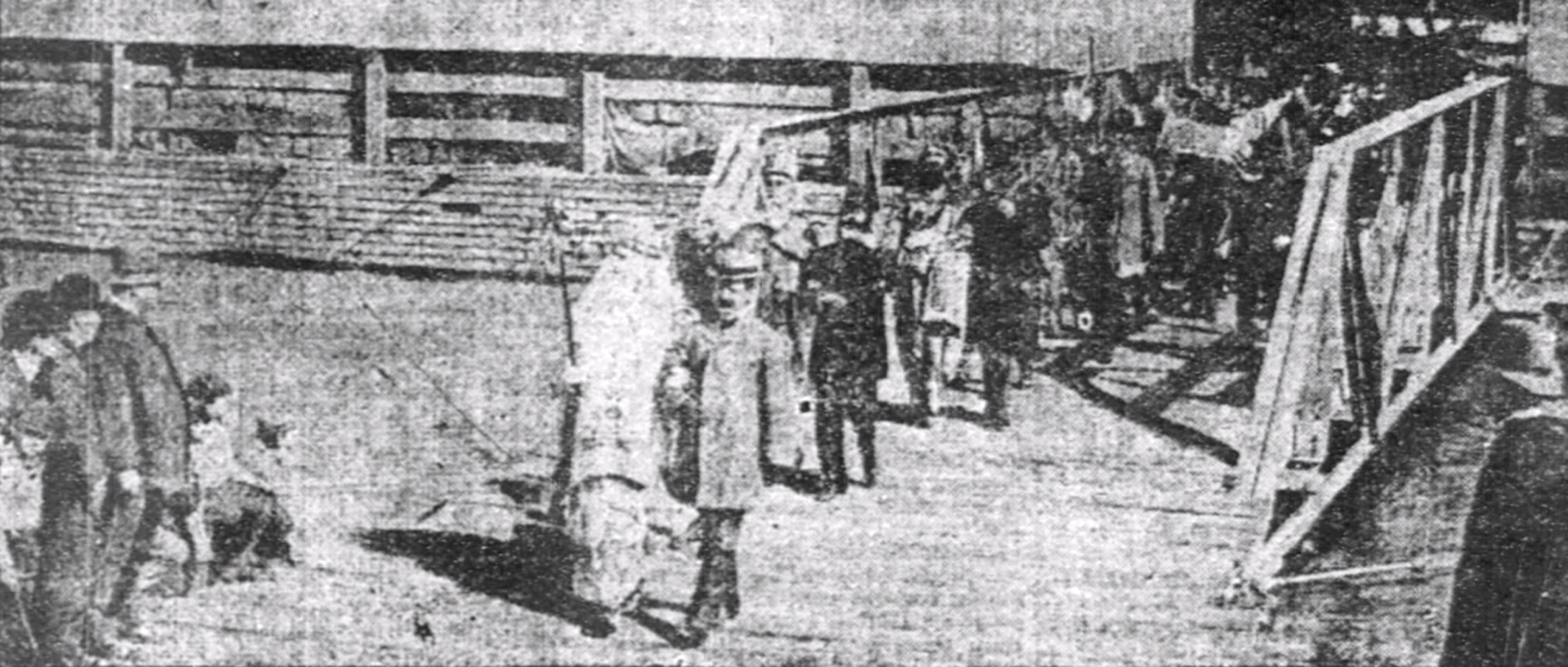
Judge Selden P. Spencer leads St. Louis's Veiled Prophet from the riverboat War Eagle to the dock at Jefferson Barracks in October 1892.

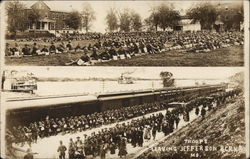
Troops leaving Jefferson Barracks to deploy to the east coast and onward to France.

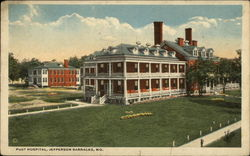
Jefferson Barracks Hospital on October 10, 1918.

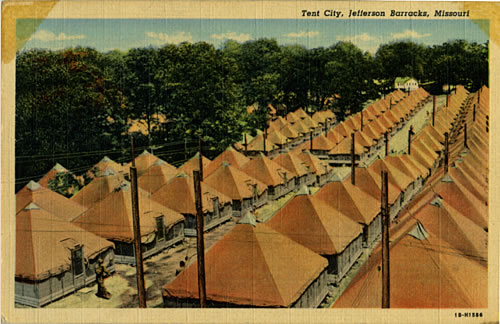
Jefferson Barracks Basic Training Camp during World War II.

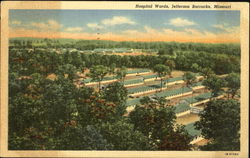
Jefferson Barracks Hospital Wards on December 10, 1942.

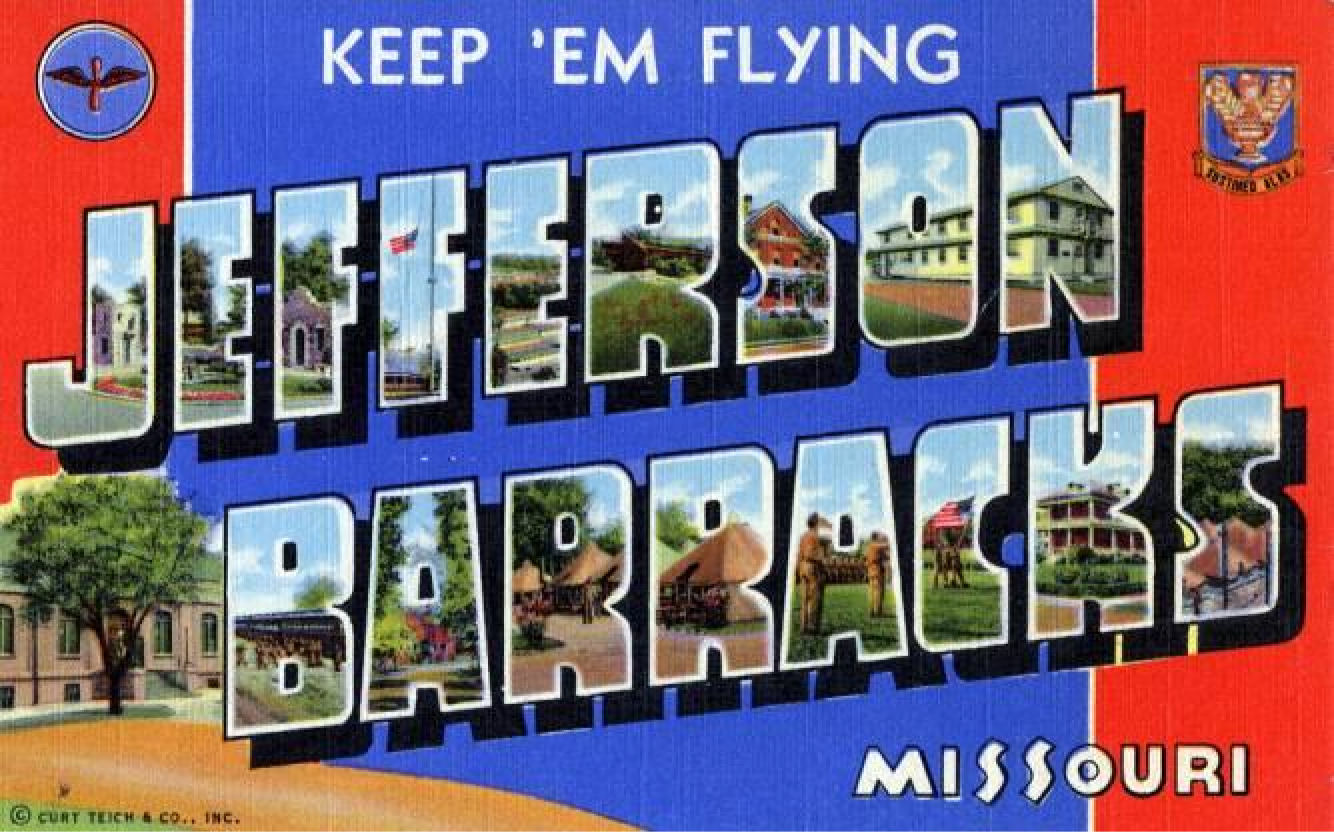
Army Air Forces Postcard from Jefferson Barracks during World War II.

In 1826 General Edmund P. Gaines (Commander of the Western Department of the Army), Brig. General Henry Atkinson (commanding officer of the sixth infantry regiment), explorer William Clark, and Missouri Governor John Miller spent several days searching the banks of the Mississippi River for the perfect location for a new post to replace Fort Bellefontaine. A site near the city of "Vide Poche" or Carondelet, ten miles (16 km) south of St. Louis, was recommended and then approved by Major General Jacob J. Brown, Commanding General of the Army.

On July 10, 1826, two days after the deed to the land was signed, the first military troops—six officers and 245 enlisted men of Companies A, B, H and I of the 1st Infantry Regiment, commanded by Brevet Major Stephen Watts Kearny—arrived at the new post and started building temporary quarters that they named Cantonment Miller in honor of Governor Miller. In 1827 the military post was formally named Jefferson Barracks in honor of President Thomas Jefferson who had died the year before. Even William Clark's son, Meriwether Lewis Clark Sr., would join the ranks of Jefferson Barracks. It was also designated the first "Infantry School of Practice."

The first conflict that the men of Jefferson Barracks were involved with was the Black Hawk War in 1832. Troops were deployed from Jefferson Barracks to push "hostile Indians" back into their village in present-day Iowa. Chief Black Hawk was captured and brought back to Jefferson Barracks.

In 1832, the United States Regiment of Dragoons were formed and stationed at Jefferson Barracks. The dragoons, trained to fight mounted or dismounted, were the first unit of permanent cavalry in the United States Army and were later called the 1st U.S. Dragoons.

== Mexican–American War ==
Jefferson Barracks became a major military post during the Mexican–American War (1846–1848) when it served as a rest and supply station for most U.S. troops deploying to Mexico. Jefferson Barracks was the recruiting center for outfitting and training most of the regiments organized for the Mexican War in 1846, and upon the return of the triumphant U.S. forces in 1848, many were deployed to Jefferson Barracks due to its strategic location and healthful situation.

In 1853, newly elected President Franklin Pierce, who had served as a brigadier general during the Mexican War, appointed Jefferson Davis as his Secretary of War.

At Jefferson Barracks, in 1855, Davis soon organized the First and Second Regiments of Cavalry, known derisively as "Jeff Davis's Pets," because the commissioned personnel assigned to them were the best in the Army. Albert Sidney Johnston served as colonel and Robert E. Lee as lieutenant colonel of the Second Regiment of Cavalry. A list of the officers of the Second Regiment of Cavalry includes some of the ablest commanders of the U.S. Civil War. The Second Regiment of Cavalry was redesignated as the Fifth Regiment of Cavalry in 1861. The 2d U.S. Dragoons were redesignated as the 2d Regiment of Cavalry in 1861 when the War Department discontinued the use of Dragoons as a unit designation.

== Civil War ==
During the American Civil War (1861–1865), Jefferson Barracks served as a military hospital for both sides and a recruitment depot for the North. In 1862 construction of the Western Sanitary Commission's hospital facilities began at Jefferson Barracks. By the time that the hospital complex was complete, it could hold 3,000 patients. By the end of the first year of the war, over 5,000 sick and wounded had been admitted and, by the end of the war, well over 18,000 soldiers had been treated at Jefferson Barracks Hospital. In 2002, The Missouri Civil War Museum was founded, which finished restoration in 2013. It is now located in the old 1905 Post Exchange and Gymnasium Building.

== Spanish–American War ==
With the declaration of the Spanish–American War in 1898, many regular army and volunteer regiments were, once again, formed and outfitted at Jefferson Barracks. Jefferson Barracks was permanently designated as a recruiting depot in 1906; it had been used intermittently as such through generations.

== World War I ==
On March 1, 1912, Jefferson Barracks became the main base for the first experiments in aviation parachuting. Albert Berry became the first person to successfully parachute from an airplane, which was being flown by Anthony Jannus over the field.

During World War I, Jefferson Barracks served as a training and recruitment station for soldiers heading to Europe.

Jefferson Barracks was included in the Sixth Corps Area from 1920 to 1940. During the 1930s, the Citizens Military Training Camp or CMTC was held at Jefferson Barracks. Young men could spend one month a year at the post being trained as a soldier, and after three years they could enter the military. Also during that time the Works Progress Administration (WPA) had camps at Jefferson Barracks.

== World War II ==
During World War II, Jefferson Barracks was a major reception center for U.S. troops being drafted into the military. It also served as an important basic training site for the Army, then later was the first Army Air Corps Training Site. Elements of the Central (later Eastern) Technical Training Command were stationed at the barracks.

During World War II, Jefferson Barracks had a peak area of 1,518 acres (6.14 km^{2}), and had billeting space for 16 officers and 1,500 enlisted persons.

Jefferson Barracks was decommissioned as a military post in 1946 with the end of World War II.

== Post-World War II ==
After Jefferson Barracks was decommissioned, portions of the grounds were sold off for construction of houses. Some of the barracks were acquired by the St. Louis County Housing Authority as temporary low-cost housing. Those were demolished in the 1960s and replaced by the current Jefferson Townhomes development. Bishop DuBourg High School was located on the Jefferson Barracks property for several years in the early 1950s. The former Jefferson Barracks School is now used for storage and maintenance; and the former theater is St. Bernadette Catholic Church.

It is now the site of two St. Louis County Parks (Jefferson Barracks County Park and Sylvan Springs County Park), a National Guard Base (Army and Air), the Jefferson Barracks National Cemetery and the Department of Veterans Affairs St. Louis Health Care System - Jefferson Barracks Division. Part of the hospital grounds were donated to the Mehlville School District in the 1960s to build Charles S. Beasley Elementary School.

Today, the 135-acre National Guard post at Jefferson Barracks is home to the 70th Troop Command, the Missouri Army National Guard's largest brigade. The post is also headquarters for the Region 7 Homeland Response Force; the Missouri Air National Guard's 157th Air Operations Group and the 10th Psychological Operations Battalion of the U.S. Army Reserve.

During the 1960s and 1970s, portions of Jefferson Barracks County Park were used as a landfill. During the 1980s, an annual balloon race was held in the park. Today, because of its large size, high school cross country races are often held in the park in the fall months, most notably the Hancock Invitational.

== Museums ==
=== Jefferson Barracks Museums ===
Jefferson Barracks County Park includes the several museums, museums that house artifacts and history of Jefferson Barracks while it was an active United States Military Post. The Powder Magazine Museum focuses on the history of Jefferson Barracks from its inception in 1826 until its closure in 1946. The Old Ordnance Room, also once a powder magazine, features temporary exhibits with military themes. The Laborer's House Museum shows a typical mid 1800s family residence.

=== Missouri Civil War Museum ===
The Missouri Civil War Museum opened in the park in June 2013 after an eleven-year historic renovation of the 1905 Post Exchange and Gymnasium Building, which is on the National Register of Historic Places. The museum is the largest Civil War museum in the state of Missouri with over 22,000 square feet and two floors of exhibits. Displays focus on the state's role during the American Civil War and exhibit hundreds of remarkable artifacts from the Civil War. Additional galleries in the museum focus on the history of Jefferson Barracks, veterans organizations, and the Civil War in pop culture. The museum has also renovated the adjacent 1918 Post Exchange Building, which is used for museum educational and public programs.

=== Jefferson Barracks Telephone Museum ===
Besides its extensive collection of telephones manufactured from the 1900s through the 2000s, the Jefferson Barracks Telephone Museum also contains a working Central Office Step Switch, military telephones from World War II through the Vietnam War, hundreds of pieces of telephone-related equipment and tools, a telephone pole complete with climbing equipment, hundreds of pieces of telephone-related memorabilia from the 1880s through the 2000s, a large variety of novelty telephones, a special portable switchboard set up when U.S. Presidents Carter, Ford, Nixon and Johnson were visiting St. Louis and a sculpture of Alexander Graham Bell and history of the invention of the telephone. The building housing the museum was constructed as a two-story duplex by Richard Deutman and Son architects and is one of two remaining structures that was part of Officers’ Row located on the north side of the former parade grounds.

The self-guided, accessible museum has many hands-on, how-things-work displays.

== Army units organized at Jefferson Barracks ==
1. United States Regiment of Dragoons – March 4, 1833
2. 2nd Regiment of Dragoons – May 23, 1836
3. Regiment of Mounted Riflemen – October 12, 1846
4. U.S. 4th Cavalry Regiment – March 26, 1855 (Originally 1st Cavalry Regiment)
5. U.S. 22d Infantry Regiment – December, 1865 (Originally 3rd Battalion, 13th Infantry Regiment)

== Air Force units organized at Jefferson Barracks ==
1. 157th Air Operations Group
2. 131st Tactical Fighter Group, later 131st Fighter Wing, now 131st Bomb Wing
3. 239th Combat Communication (CBCS) Squadron
4. 266 Ground Electronics Engineering Installation Agency (GEEIA) Squadron.
5. 218th Engineering Installation Squadron
6. 131st Force Support Squadron
7. 231st Civil Engineer Flight
8. 131st Civil Engineer Squadron

== See also ==
- Jefferson Barracks National Cemetery
- Missouri World War II Army Airfields
