= Joint Interface Control Officer =

The Joint Interface Control Officer (JICO) is the senior multi-tactical data link interface control officer in support of joint task force operations. The JICO is responsible for effecting planning and management of the joint tactical data link network within a theater of operations.
