= 612th Air Operations Center =

612th Air Operations Center

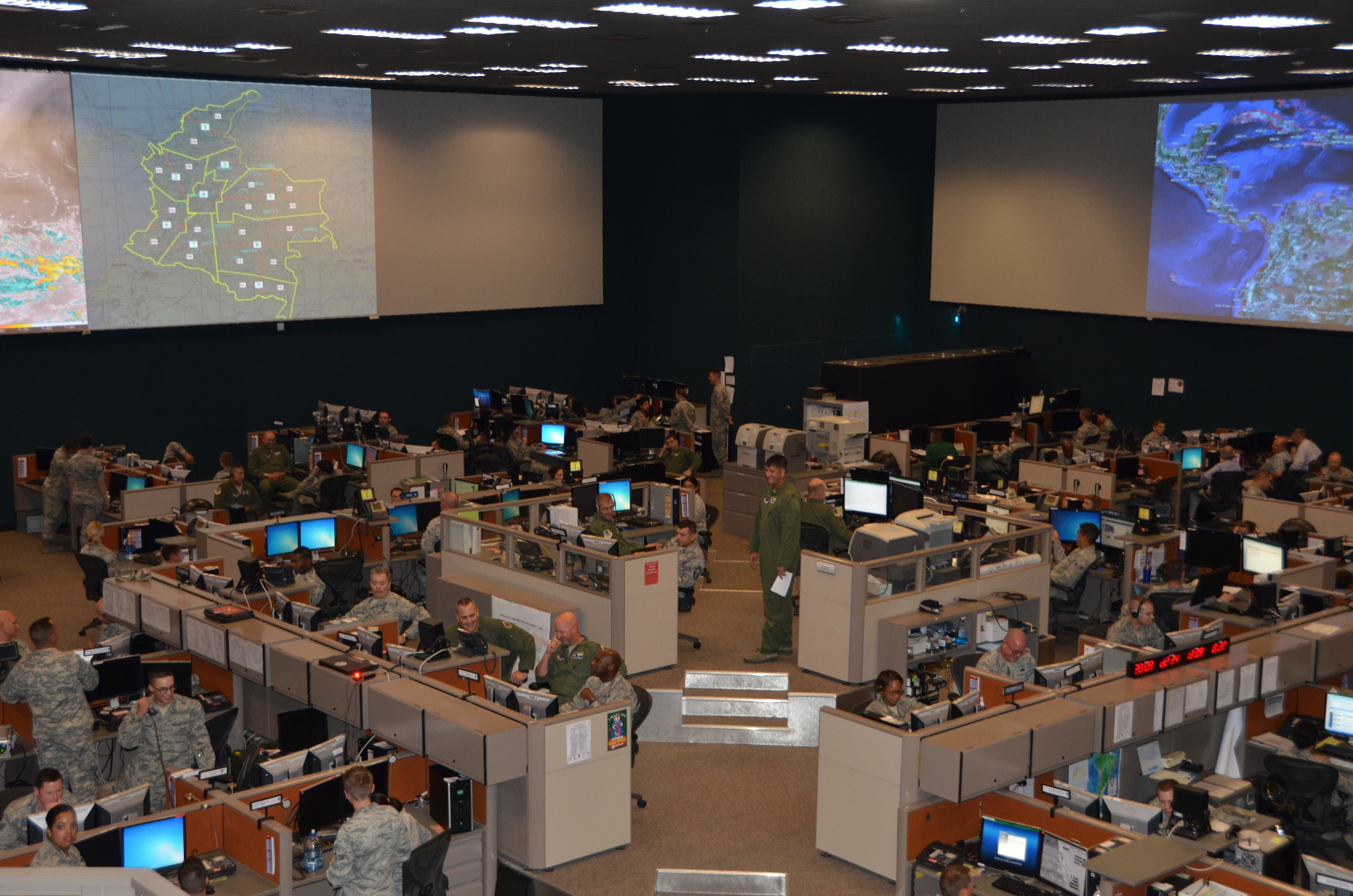
- The operations center at Davis–Monthan Air Force Base in 2013
- Active: 1994–present
- Country: United States
- Branch: United States Air Force
- Part of: Air Combat Command: Twelfth Air Force
- Garrison/HQ: Davis–Monthan Air Force Base, Arizona

Insignia
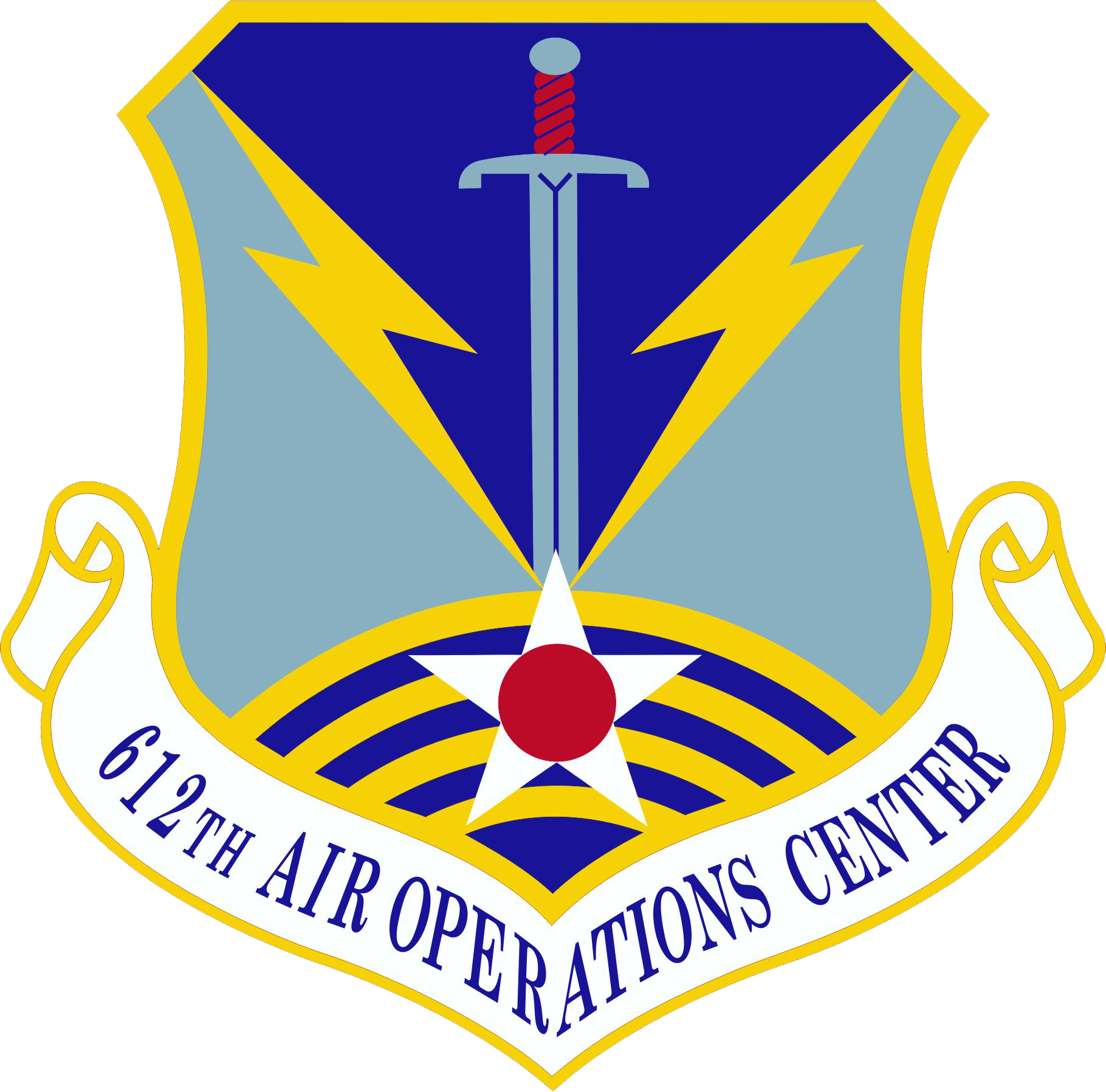
- 612th Air Operations Center emblem (approved 22 March 2001, newest rendition 5 February 2015)

The 612th Air Operations Center (612 AOC) is an active unit of the United States Air Force, assigned to the Twelfth Air Force and stationed at Davis–Monthan Air Force Base, Arizona. First activated in 1994, the unit coordinates air and space assets in the U.S. Southern Command area of responsibility, covering 31 countries in the Caribbean, as well as Central and South America. Past missions have included the coordination of all flight operations in response to the 2010 Haiti earthquake. In 2007, the unit opened a new $55 million command center.

== Structure ==
The 612th Air Operations Center consists of the following six elements:

- 1st Battlefield Coordination Detachment (1st BCD)
- Air Mobility Division (AMD)
- Combat Operations Division (COD)
- Combat Plans Division (CPD)
- Intelligence, Surveillance, and Reconnaissance Division (ISRD)
- Strategy Division (SRD)

== Lineage ==
- Established as the 612th Air Operations Group and activated on 1 January 1994

Redesignated as 612th Air and Space Operations Center on 29 February 2008
Redesignated as 612th Air Operations Center on 15 November 2014

=== Assignments ===
- Twelfth Air Force, 1 January 1994–present

=== Stations ===
- Davis–Monthan Air Force Base, Arizona, 1 January 1994–present
