= Blue Flag (United States Air Force exercise) =

Blue Flag is an exercise of the United States Air Force that trains participants at the operational level of war. It is administered by the 505th Combat Training Squadron at Hurlburt Field with the goal of every numbered Air Force to participate every two years.
