= 616th Operations Center =

616th Operations Center

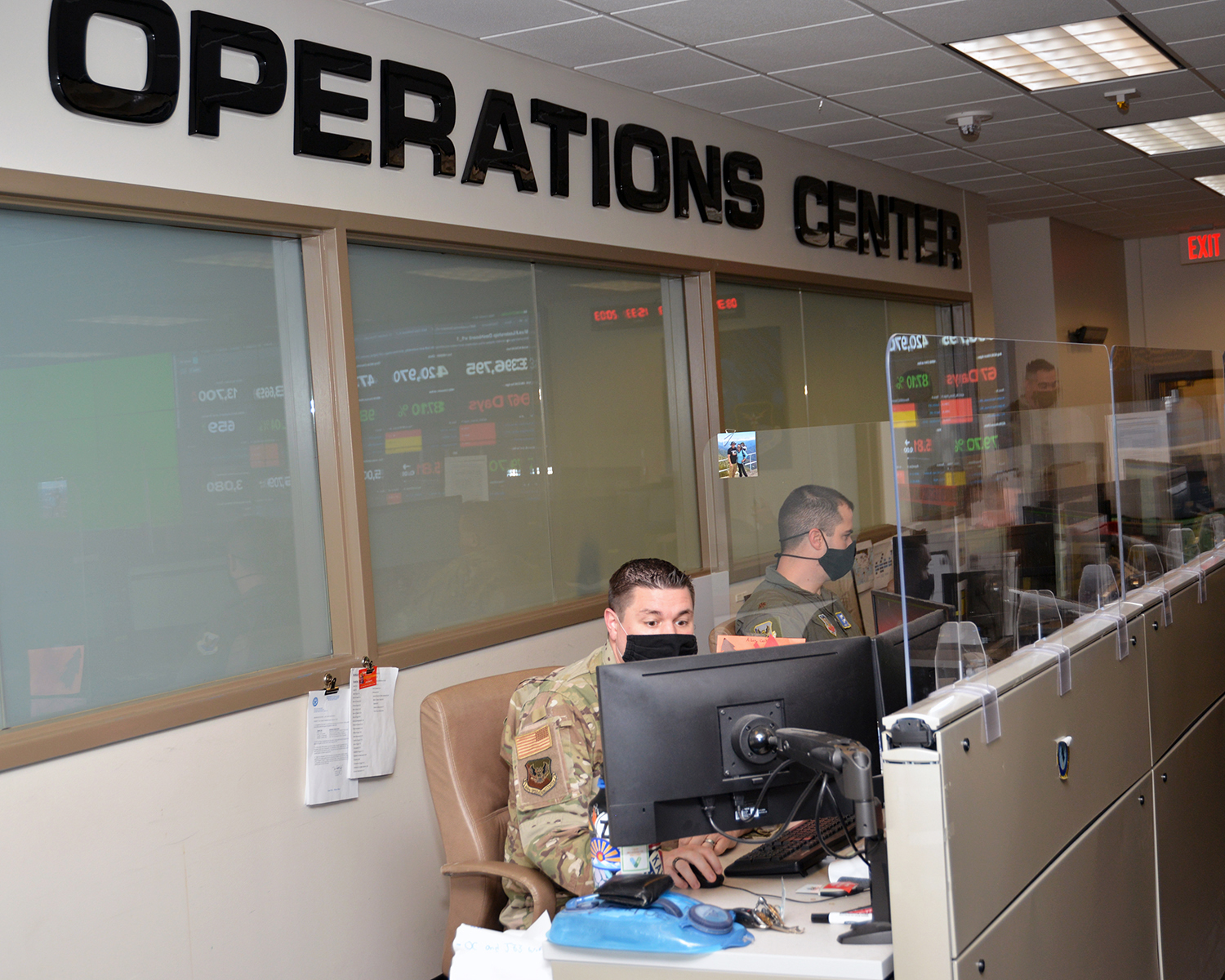
- 616th Operations Center airmen at Sixteenth Air Force Headquarters in 2021
- Active: March 2020 – present
- Country: United States
- Branch: United States Air Force
- Part of: Air Combat Command: Sixteenth Air Force
- Garrison/HQ: Joint Base San Antonio, Texas

Insignia
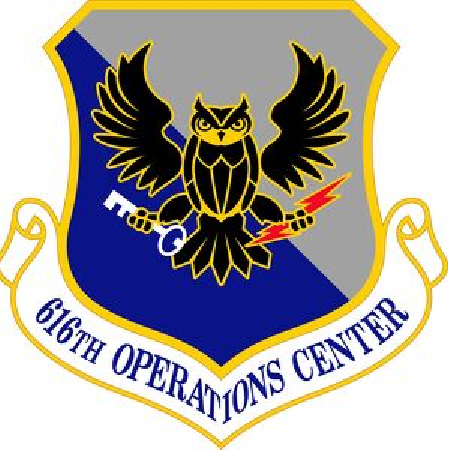
- 616 Operations Center emblem

The 616th Operations Center is an active unit of the United States Air Force, assigned to the Sixteenth Air Force. It is stationed at Joint Base San Antonio, Texas. It was activated on 16 March 2020 to replace the 624th Operations Center and the 625th Operations Center which were inactivated the same day. The 616th coordinates the operations of 178 units worldwide, with capabilities including cyber warfare, electronic warfare, intelligence, surveillance and reconnaissance (ISR), and weather.

== Lineage ==
- Activated as the 616th Operations Center circa 16 March 2020

=== Assignments ===
- Sixteenth Air Force, c. 16 March 2020 – present

=== Components ===
- 616th Air Communications Squadron, 4 November 2020 – present

=== Stations ===
- Joint Base San Antonio-Lackland, Texas, c. 16 March 2020 – present
