= Air tasking order =

Special Weapons Tactics HIGH RISK UNIT

An air tasking order (ATO) is a means by which the Joint Forces Air Component Commander (JFACC) controls air forces within a joint operations environment. The ATO is a large document written in United States Message Text Format (USMTF) that lists air sorties for a fixed 24-hour period, with individual call signs, aircraft types, and mission types (e.g. close air support or air refueling). NATO uses a different text format, “.ato”. The ATO is created by an Air Operations Center (AOC) which has command and control for a particular theater (e.g. Combined Air Operations Center for Southwest Asia). More specifically, the Combat Plans Division of the AOC is responsible for creating the ATO, as well as the associated Airspace Control Order (ACO) and linked detailed information in the Special Instructions (SPINS).

Use of the standardized USMTF allows ATO processing by a variety of legacy computer models, newer software, and even word processors. Since 2004, the ATO has been standardized as an XML schema by NATO Allied Data Publication-3 and US MIL-STD-6040.

The ATO was historically known as the "fragmentary order" or "frag order" or “Frag-O” or "FRAGO". Pilots continue to informally refer to it as the "frag"; to be "fragged" to a mission is to be assigned to it, and "as fragged" indicates that an operation will/did occur in accordance with the original ATO, without modifications.

== Definition ==
As defined by Joint Publication 1-02, an air tasking order is:

A method used to task and disseminate to components, subordinate units, and command and control agencies projected sorties, capabilities, and/or forces to targets and specific missions. [It] normally provides specific instructions to include call signs, targets, controlling agencies, etc., as well as general instructions.

== See also ==
- Air Operations Center (also known as an AOC, CAOC, or JAOC)
- Joint Forces Air Component Commander (JFACC)
