= IRocket =

American aerospace company

Innovative Rocket Technologies Inc.
- Type: Private
- Industry: Aerospace; Defense
- Founded: December 2018; 7 years ago
- Founder: Asad Malik
- Key people: Asad Malik (CEO & Chairman)
- Products: Launch vehicles
- Website: irocketusa.com

iRocket (Innovative Rocket Technologies Inc) is a startup based in New York, founded in 2018, which develops rocket engines and a small reusable launch vehicle named Shockwave. In 2021, iRocket signed a Space Act Agreement With NASA's Marshall Space Flight Center to accelerate the development of its reusable rocket engine. The company received in 2023 a $1.8 million AFWERX TACFI contract from the U.S. Space Force Space Systems Command (SSC) to develop the rocket engine. The company also signed in 2023 a four-year Cooperative Research and Development Agreement (CRADA) with the Air Force to test its engine technology at the Air Force Research Laboratory (AFRL) High Thrust Research Facility.

Shockwave will be a fully reusable rocket, 125 feet tall, 9 feet in diameter, designed to transport 1.500 kg to low earth orbit (LEO). All stages will be reusable. First launch is planned for 2027. The methalox engine is manufactured via 3D printing and will be 100% reusable.
