= Public affairs (military) =

Type of military office focused on public communications

Public affairs is a term for the formal offices of the branches of the United States Department of Defense whose purpose is to deal with the media and community issues. The term is also used for numerous media relations offices that are created by the U.S. military for more specific limited purposes. Public affairs offices are staffed by a combination of officers, enlisted personnel, civilian officials and contract professionals.

While modern military public affairs emphasizes transparency and the provision of factual information, it operates within a broader historical and strategic context that includes the use of propaganda. Propaganda is defined as the deliberate, systematic attempt to shape perceptions, manipulate cognitions, and direct behavior to achieve a response that furthers the desired intent of the propagandist. It has long been a tool of statecraft and warfare. For instance, during World War II, the U.S. government established the Office of War Information to produce posters, films, and other materials designed to unify public opinion, conserve resources, and mobilize the workforce. In contemporary military doctrine, these principles are foundational to areas like information operations, defined as the integrated employment of information-related capabilities to influence, disrupt, corrupt, or usurp the decision-making of adversaries. and political warfare, which seeks to influence foreign audiences and adversaries, often exploiting digital technologies to shape perceptions and achieve strategic objectives.

Public affairs offices play a key role in contingency and deployed operations.

The typical public affairs office is led by an officer who is in charge of planning, budgeting for, executing and evaluating the effectiveness of public affairs programs, and provides public affairs advice, counsel and support for commanders and senior staff members.

== Duties and responsibilities ==
The public affairs officer (PAO) is responsible for developing a working relationship with reporters and other media representatives, maintaining a robust community relations program, keeping contact with other government agencies, and keeping internal and external publics informed on issues that may affect them. Known as "PAO's" for short, they are expected to coordinate with the appropriate agencies prior to contacting and releasing information to the media on conditions that might result in favorable or unfavorable public reaction, including releases and public statements involving local, regional and national news.

PAOs are responsible for preparing information relative to unit participation in military operations, world events, and environmental matters through news releases, special activities, photographs, radio and television, and other informational material. They also review materials such as speeches, news articles, and radio and television shows for security policy review and integration with the objectives of the military, and determine appropriate topics.

PAOs oversee the production of base newspapers, magazines, and internal information produced by enlisted Public Affairs specialists that include coordinating media visits (if possible) and writing stories to share with fellow deployed personnel as well as audiences back home, both military and civilian. They also produce speeches and act as ghost writers for commanders, often completely developing a commander's public persona.

Additionally, PAOs act as a liaison with Hollywood, actively courting Film Studios through Entertainment Liaison Offices based in Los Angeles (as an example, Navy Office of Information West). PAOs trained in understanding the needs and requirements of Film Production, attempt to shape the representation of the services concerned. They try to find an acceptable arrangement that allows the production to get the necessary footage while protecting the reputation of the service concerned.

Tyrese Gibson's character in Michael Bay's Transformers series was an example of the positive results through cooperation between the United States Department of Defense and Hollywood. Bay gained access to USAF bases and assets for the film, while the Air Force was not only able to showcase sophisticated USAF aircraft in the movie, they also helped develop one of the main characters - a combat controller (1C2X1).

== In the United States ==
=== Training ===
The Public Affairs community of the United States Armed Forces consists of active duty, national guard, and reserve service members, civilians and consultants to provide support for managing the flow of news and information for the military. Public affairs officers and enlisted members often attend joint training at the Defense Information School (DINFOS) at Ft. Meade, Maryland prior to their first duty station and for online and instructor-led professional development coursework and advanced training throughout their careers.

=== Army ===
The United States Army’s public affairs enterprise was restructured in 2025 as part of the Secretary of the Army’s Continuous Transformation initiative, which modernized the Army’s approach to communications, outreach, and public engagement.

The enterprise is directed by the Army Communications and Outreach Office (ACOO), the senior office responsible for strategic communication, media relations, and public affairs integration across the Army.

As of August 11, 2025, the office is led by Rebecca Hodson, a Presidential Appointee serving as the Director of Army Communications and Outreach. Under the new structure established by General Order No. 1, signed by Secretary of the Army Daniel Driscoll, the Chief of Public Affairs title was retained for the senior uniformed officer, Colonel David Butler, who now serves as the Military Deputy to the Director.

This change formalized the alignment of the Army’s civilian and military public affairs leadership, with the Chief of Public Affairs reporting to the Director. The new structure was designed to unify communications strategy, streamline decision-making, and accelerate modernization across all Army communication platforms."Army Secretariat Organizational Chart (as of 5 September 2025)" (PDF). U.S. Army.

On October 1, 2018, the United States Army merged the enlisted Military Occupational Specialties (MOS) 46Q Public Affairs Specialist and 46R Public Affairs Broadcast Specialist into a single MOS, 46S Public Affairs Mass Communications Specialist. All Army enlisted public affairs Soldiers in the ranks of private to staff sergeant fall under this new MOS, while those in the ranks of sergeant first class to sergeant major will remain in MOS 46Z Chief Public Affairs NCO.

Army officers from the 18 primary officer branches are able to apply to join the Public Affairs Functional Area (FA46) upon being selected for promotion to 1st lieutenant. If selected by the Voluntary Transfer Incentive Program (VTIP), officers are given the officer Functional Area code 46A. They will then serve as public affairs officers at the brigade level and higher.

On 15 January 2026, Public Affairs was established as a basic branch of the Army. On 15 October 2026, the Army established the United States Army Public Affairs School (USAPAS) at Fort Meade, Maryland.

=== Marine Corps Communication Strategy and Operations ===
Formerly Marine Corps public affairs, the United States Marine Corps made significant changes to the organization and naming conventions of its public affairs occupational field in 2017 and 2018. The overall goal of the changes was to enhance situational awareness and command and control for the rest of the Marine Corps while improving the Marine Corps’ overall ability to exploit opportunities and maneuver in the modern information environment.

In October 2017, the 43XX public affairs and 46XX combat camera occupational fields merged into a single 45XX occupational field and was designated Communication Strategy and Operations (CommStrat). In September 2018, the Office of U.S. Marine Corps Communication was renamed Communication Directorate (CD). The name change was purely administrative and the mission, tasks, and organization of the office was unchanged. The Director of the CD remained a brigadier general.

During this re-organization, the Communication Strategy and Operations Company became a single entity as part of the Marine Expeditionary Force (MEF) Information Group (MIG). The mission of the CommStrat Company is to plan and execute inform operations, to include public engagement and the acquisition, production, and dissemination of communication and other information products.

Marines within the Communication Strategy and Operations community are identified by Military Occupational Specialties (MOS):

Enlisted

- 4531 (Combat Mass Communicator)
- 4512 (Combat Graphics Specialist)
- 4541 (Combat Photographer)
- 4571 (Combat Videographer)
- 4591 (Communication Strategy and Operations Chief)
- 4511 (Recruiting Station Marketing and Communication Marine; this is an alternate MOS)

Officer

- 4502 (Communication Strategy and Operations Officer)
- 4503 (Visual Information Officer)
- 4505 (Communication Strategy and Operations Planner)

=== Navy ===
The United States Navy public affairs community is led by the Chief of Naval Information (CHINFO) within the U.S. Navy Office of Information. As of January 2024, the Chief of Information was Rear Admiral Ryan M. Perry. Rear Admiral (lower half) John A. Robinson III serves as the Vice Chief of Information.

Enlisted members of the Navy public affairs community are rated as Mass Communication Specialist (MC). Officers in Navy public affairs are Restricted Line Officers and hold the Special Duty Officer (Public Affairs) designator 165X.

The annual CHINFO Merit Awards (CMA) Program recognizes outstanding achievements in internal media products produced by Navy commands and individuals.

=== Air Force ===
The Secretary of the Air Force Office of Public Affairs (SAF/PA) serves in the leadership role for the United States Air Force's public affairs community. Air Force public affairs officers hold the 35P Air Force Specialty Code (AFSC). The enlisted public affairs AFSC is 3N0X6, Public Affairs apprentice, journeyman, or craftsman, depending on skill level.

=== Coast Guard ===
The Director of Governmental and Public Affairs (CG-092) serves as the senior executive public affairs officer for the United States Coast Guard. As of 2017 The current director is Rear Admiral Anthony J. Vogt.

Enlisted Coast Guard members are rated as Public Affairs Specialist (PA) after attending the Defense Information School and come from the Active and Reserve components.

Based at the Douglas A. Munro Coast Guard Headquarters Building in Washington D.C., The Office of Public Affairs (CG-0922) oversees PAs in support of media relations stationed in major media markets throughout the United States. They work for public affairs officers on district and area commanders' support staffs or in small public-affairs detachments located in major metropolitan areas.

== See also ==
- Coalition Chronicle, a monthly, military magazine of stories and news briefs about military members in Iraq.
- Enemy Image, a documentary about The Pentagon's approach to news coverage of war
- Information warfare
- Pentagon rapid response operation
- Public relations
