= Army Venture Capital Corporation =

Venture capital arm of the US Army

- Company type: Venture capital firm
- Industry: Defense
- Key people: Jake Chapman (Managing Director)
- Website: https://www.army.vc/

The Army Venture Capital Corporation (AVCC) is the venture capital arm of the United States Army.

== History ==
The AVCC was established by the U.S. Congress in 2002 with an initial funding allocation of twenty-five million dollars. The organization has achieved limited success in accomplishing its stated goals since its founding.

== See also ==
- Defense Innovation Unit – similar organization launched to assist the Department of Defense in leveraging commercial markets
- In-Q-Tel – similar organization chartered through the CIA
