= Vannevar Labs =

Palo Alto-based national security intelligence company

- Type: Private
- Industry: Technology; Artificial Intelligence
- Founded: 2019
- Founders: Brett Granberg; Nini Moorhead
- Headquarters: Palo Alto, United States
- Area served: Global
- Services: Data science; Analytics
- Website: vannevarlabs.com

Vannevar Labs is a Silicon Valley company that develops national security intelligence technology. The company's flagship product, Decrypt, uses artificial intelligence and large language models to process intelligence data to support military operations. The company was founded in Palo Alto in 2019.

== History ==
Vannevar Labs was founded in Palo Alto, California in 2019 by Brett Granberg and Nini Moorhead, two classmates from Stanford Graduate School of Business. The company is named after American scientist and inventor Vannevar Bush. This early computer pioneer also co-founded the Manhattan Project. Granberg had worked at intelligence community non-profit VC firm In-Q-Tel, and deep learning translation company Lilt. Moorhead had been working for seven years as a counterterrorism officer within the intelligence community. In January 2021, the company launched its first product, Decrypt, designed to apply foreign language natural language processing to translate, organize, and process data for intelligence agencies.

By January 2023, the company had raised $90 million in several funding rounds and reported that it was profitable.

In November 2024, the company signed a production contract worth up to $99 million with the Pentagon's Defense Innovation Unit, to expand its technology to more military units. The MIT Technology Review reported in April 2025 that Vannevar Labs was part of an expanding government focus on using generative AI to assist with battlefield planning, including analyzing foreign language data from a variety of different sources.

== Products and services ==
Vannevar Labs develops national security intelligence technology. Its technology uses artificial intelligence to gather and analyze data. Its uses include assisting with operational security for U.S. military personnel in dangerous situations and providing battlefield insights for allies. It uses generative AI (GenAI) to collect and process enemy data, while finding patterns, translating foreign languages, and searching for critical documents to create operational content.

The company's flagship software, ARCHER, is used to support command and control and intelligence functions across ongoing military conflicts. In July 2026, ARCHER was an awardee under the Accelerate the Procurement and Fielding of Innovative Technologies (APFIT) program to support US Pacific Command. Other applications, such as Decrypt, are reportedly in use by the US Air Force to study technical details of Russia's anti-aircraft systems.
