= Michael Brown (corporate executive) =

American corporate executive

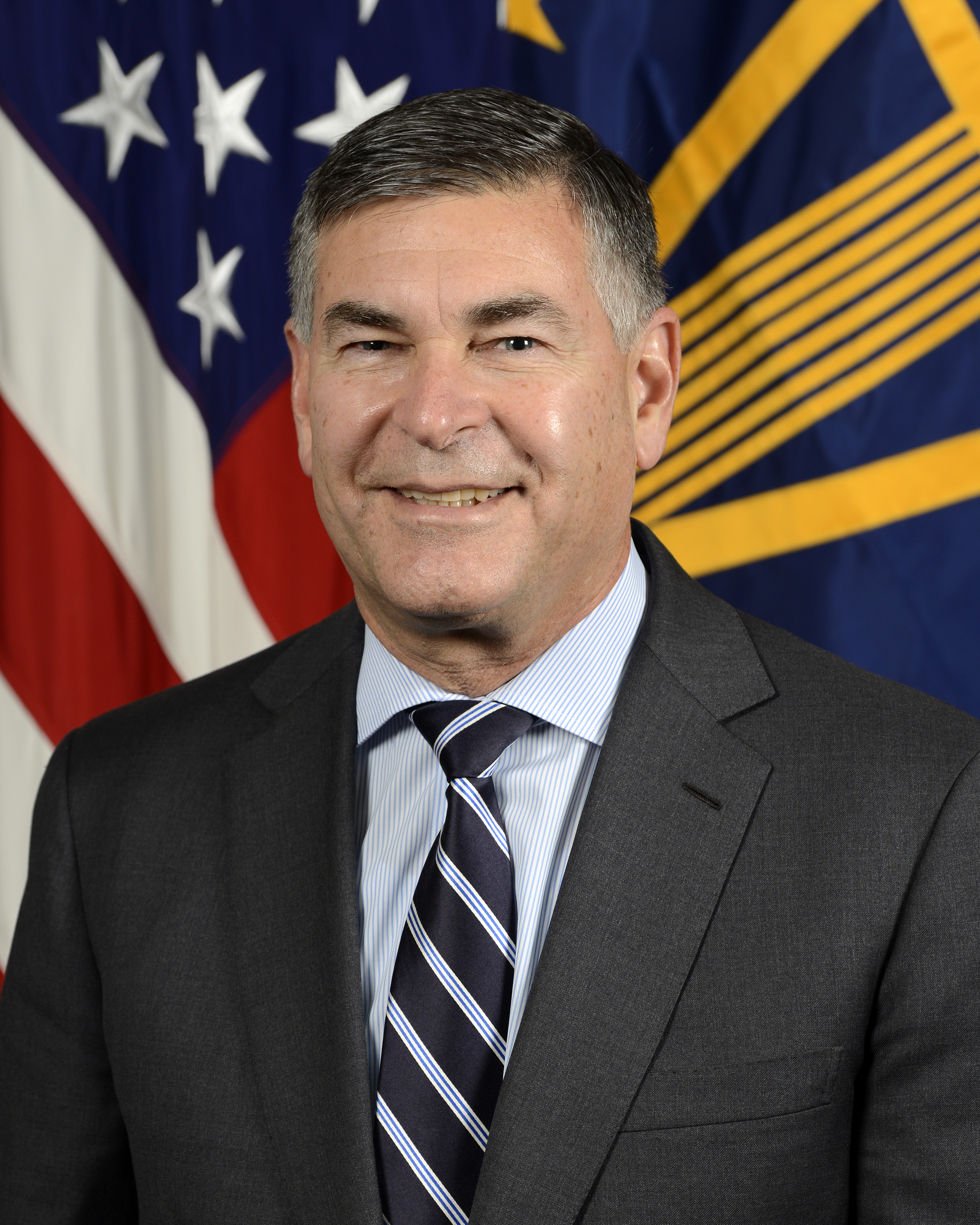

Director of the Defense Innovation Unit
- In office September 24, 2018 – September 2, 2022
- President: Donald Trump; Joe Biden
- Preceded by: Captain Sean Heritage, USN (interim)

Personal details
- Education: Harvard University (BA); Stanford University Graduate School of Business (MBA)

Michael A. Brown was managing director of the Defense Department's Innovation Unit. He previously was chief executive officer for Symantec. Brown has also been chairman of Line 6 and EqualLogic and CEO and chairman of Quantum Corp.

In 1980, Brown received a Bachelor of Arts in economics from Harvard University. In 1984, he earned a Master of Business Administration from the Stanford University Graduate School of Business. In November 2016, Brown was named a Presidential Innovation Fellow.

On April 2, 2021, President Joe Biden nominated Brown to be the Under Secretary of Defense for Acquisition and Sustainment. On July 14, in a letter to Secretary of Defense Lloyd Austin, Brown requested that his nomination be withdrawn, citing an ongoing Department of Defense Inspector General investigation. Brown left his position as managing director on September 2, 2022, and on September 9, 2022, the DoD Inspector General found the allegations to be unsubstantiated.
