= Coalition Chronicle =

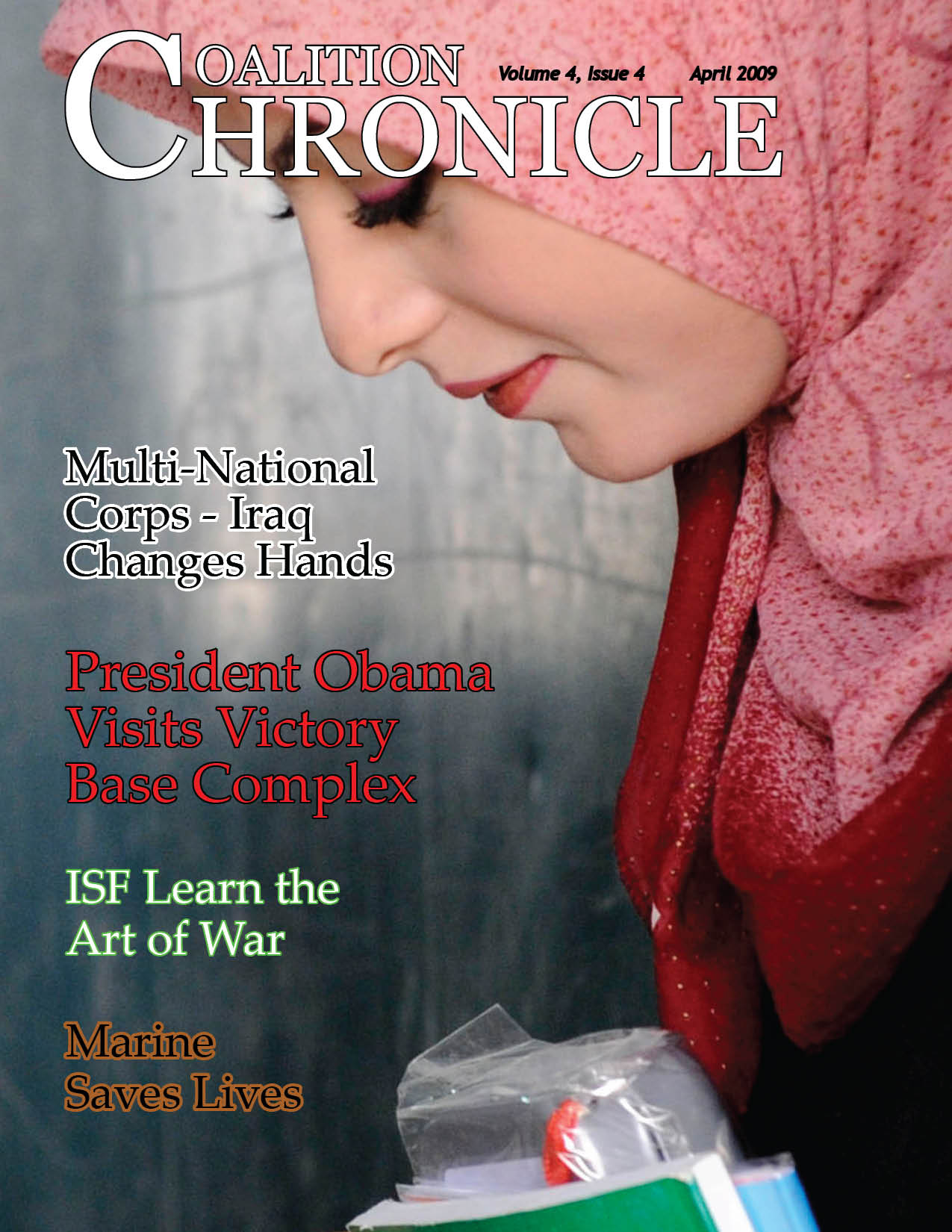
- Editor: Renea L. Everage
- Categories: Military, human interest, news
- Frequency: Monthly
- First issue: April 2006
- Final issue: 2010
- Company: MNC-I Public Affairs
- Country: United States Iraq
- Language: English
- Website: www.mnc-i.com

Coalition Chronicle was a monthly, military magazine of stories and news briefs about military members in Iraq. It was produced by Multi-National Corps - Iraq (MNC-I) Public Affairs on Camp Victory, Iraq and had a distribution of exactly 10,000 copies throughout the Iraq theater of operations for coalition service members. It was the first-ever theater-wide magazine in Iraq dedicated to publishing information and stories representational of each country in the coalition serving in Iraq.

The magazine published stories and photos highlighting missions and actions of servicemembers deployed to Iraq. Included in the magazine every month was a photo section, called "Freedom's Focal Point" which highlighted the best photos taken by military photographers in Iraq, and "In Memoriam", an updated monthly list of U.S. servicemembers who lost their lives in Iraq.

The magazine was later retitled as Scimitar.

== History ==
The Coalition Chronicle was founded in 2006 by public affairs elements of the 82nd Airborne, who were acting as the major command stationed at Camp Victory, Baghdad, Iraq under the nomenclature Multi-National Corps - Iraq.

In 2008, the Coalition Chronicle was awarded 3rd place for Magazine format publication in the military-wide journalism awards, known as the Keith L. Ware Awards. Staff responsible for producing the content were members of the 28th Public Affairs Detachment, originally deployed from Fort Lewis, WA.

Coalition Chronicle was produced by MNC-I Public Affairs and the end of publication occurred during 2010, prior to the U.S. redeployment of forces from Iraq and the closing of Camp Victory in December 2010.
