= Marine Innovation Unit =

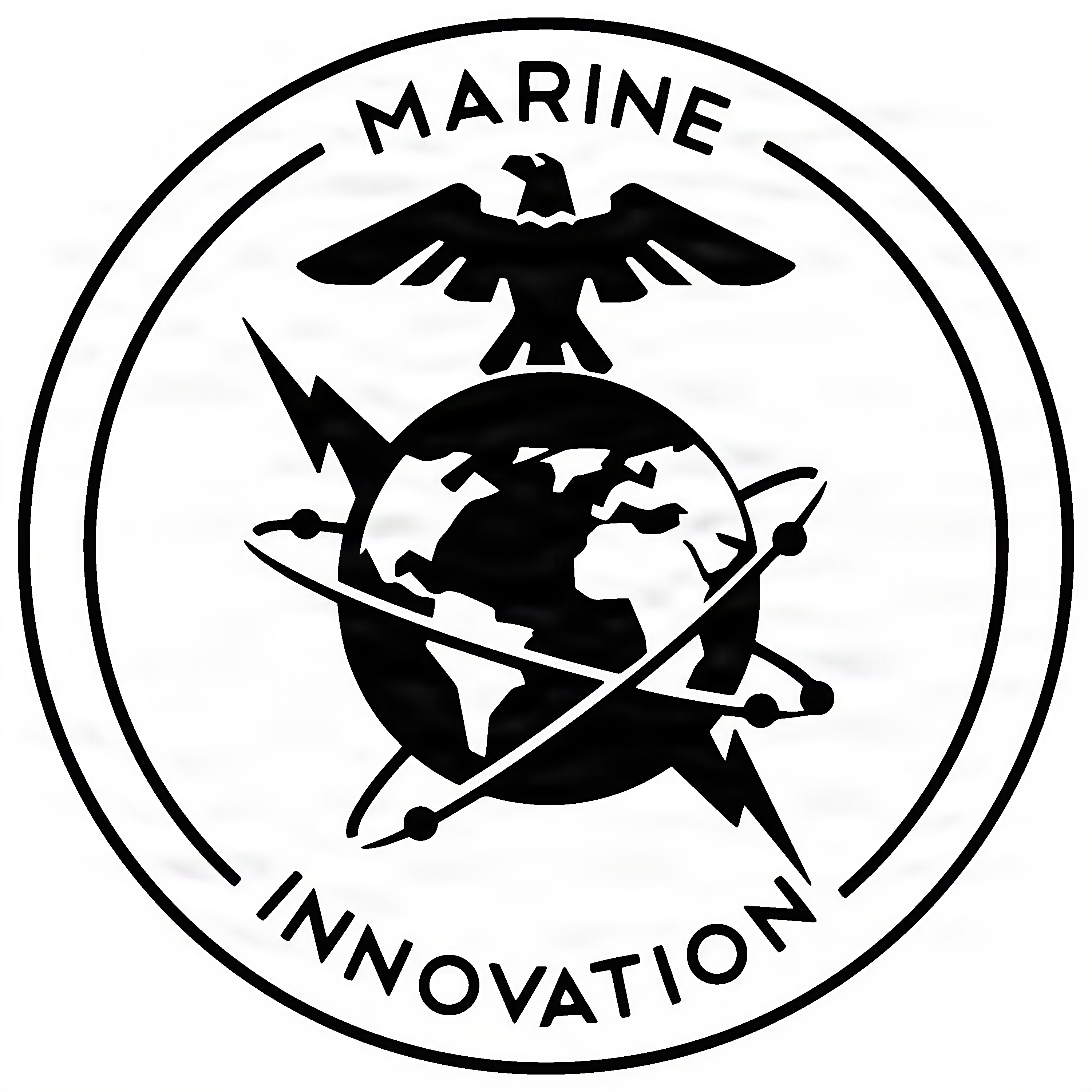
- Active: 5 May 2022–present
- Country: United States of America
- Branch: United States Marine Corps
- Role: Innovation
- Garrison/HQ: Stewart Air National Guard Base, Newburgh, New York

Commanders
- Current commander: Col. Benjamin C. Richardson
- Senior Enlisted Advisor: MGySgt. David A. Arellano

The Marine Innovation Unit (MIU) is an all-volunteer selected Marine Corps Reserve unit headquartered at Stewart Air National Guard Base in Newburgh, New York that focuses on modernizing logistics, cyber security, artificial intelligence, robotics and consulting in preparation for potential conflict with a near-peer adversaries. The unit was established on 5 May 2022.

The unit recruits reservists with technical skills and expertise from their civilian careers such as startup, venture capital, management consulting and technology companies. Active duty units send their technical problems to the MIU to solve. Marines in the unit may lead a team of others who outrank them in the USMC, but due to their civilian roles, they are the best choice to be the leader.

The team develops software, deploys new vehicles, helps Marines make sense of data and connects industry to the corps. The team often works with the United States Army Software Factory in Austin, Texas.

== See also ==
- Army Software Factory
- Kessel Run
- Marine Corps Software Factory
- Defense Innovation Unit
- AFWERX (Air Force) and SpaceWERX (Space Force)
- 75th Innovation Command (Army)
