= Army Software Factory =

Army Software Factory (ASWF)
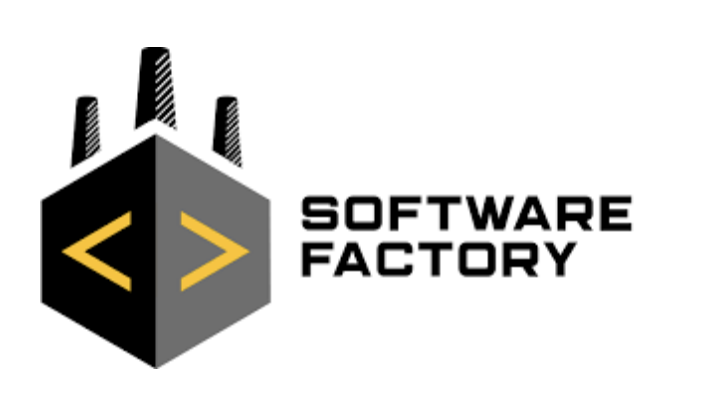
- Active: January 2021 - present
- Country: United States
- Branch: United States Army
- Part of: United States Army Transformation and Training Command
- Garrison/HQ: Austin Community College Rio Grande Campus
- Mottos: By Soldiers, For Soldiers
- Website: https://soldiersolutions.swf.army.mil/

Commanders
- Director: COL Jason Zuniga
- Chief of Operations: LTC Thomas Boehm
- Sergeant Major: MSG(P) Celeste Aust

The United States Army Software Factory (ASWF) is a software development initiative of the United States Army Transformation and Training Command (T2COM) to teach, develop and employ developers from both the military ranks and civilian workforce. The concept is to allow the Army to create its own digital tools and platforms and in many case the tools are replacing decades old paper records and forms.

== History ==
The ASWF was originally stood up under the Army Futures Command at Austin Community College Rio Grande Campus in Austin, Texas in January 2021 under co-directors Maj. Vito Errico and Maj. Jason Zuniga. The ASWF seeks out rotating groups of soldiers (E-5 sergeant through O-3 captain) and civilians through a competitive application process and trains them in modern agile software development to solve problems that can come from any soldier of any rank throughout the army. Soldiers who are accepted are sent to ASWF for a 3-year term in one of the following tracks: platform engineer, software developer, product manager or designer.

Army units with problems make contact through the ASWF website. If the project is accepted, a team goes out to the unit to understand what needs to be done and to work on a “problem statement.”

The U.S. Army created a new functional area (FA28) for graduates of the ASWF. Software Operations (FA28) has both an Officer MOS (28A) and a Warrant Officer MOS (280A) within it. The FA has a mandatory (no waivers) prerequisite of holding a technical ASI from the Army Software Factory. Even with the technical ASI, Soldiers are not guaranteed entry into the FA, selection hinges upon technical ability and manner of performance. The ASWF graduated its first group from Warrant Officer Candidate School at Fort Rucker on 10 June 2026.

== See also ==
- Kessel Run
- Marine Corps Software Factory
- Marine Innovation Unit
