= United States Army Transformation and Training Command =

Command overseeing training, doctrine, and equipment development

U.S. Army Transformation and Training Command
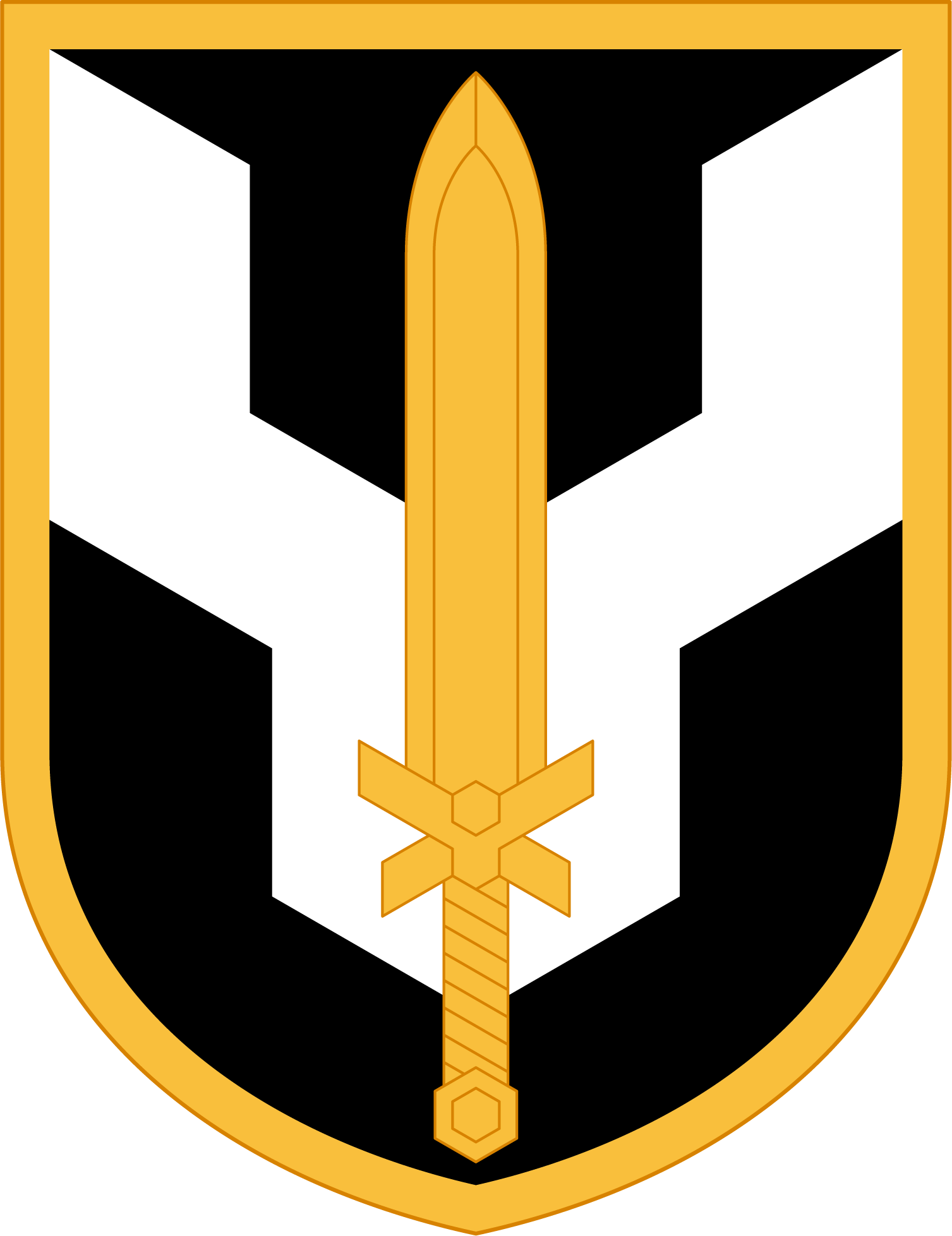
- Shoulder sleeve insignia
- Founded: October 2, 2025
- Country: United States
- Branch: United States Army
- Type: Command
- Size: 350,000
- Part of: United States Department of the Army
- Garrison/HQ: Austin, Texas
- Motto: "From Vision to Victory"
- Website: T2COM website T2COM G2 website

Commanders
- Commanding general: Vacant
- Deputy commanding general: LTG Edmond Brown
- Command Sergeant Major: CSM Raymond Harris

Insignia
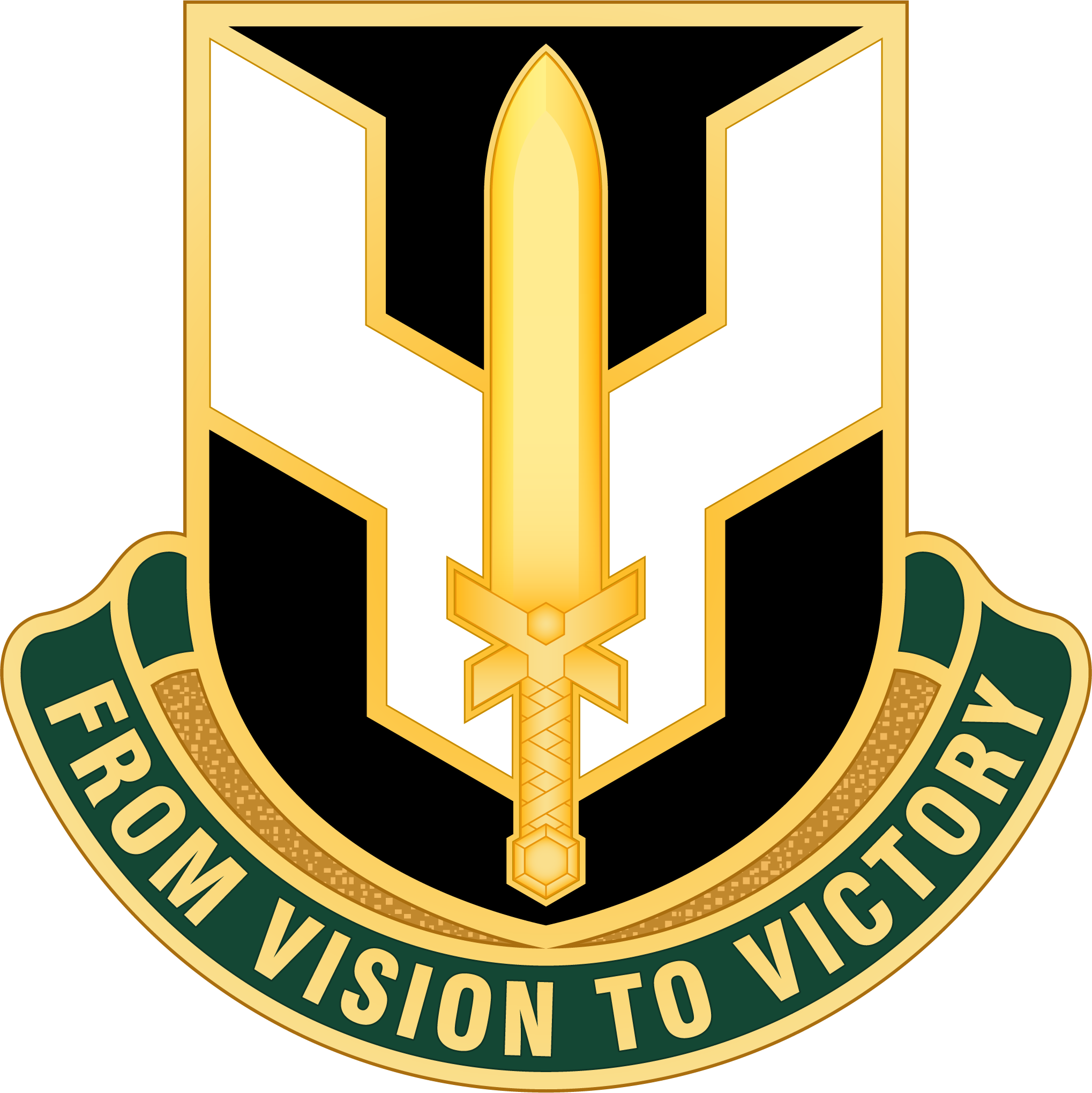
- Distinctive unit insignia

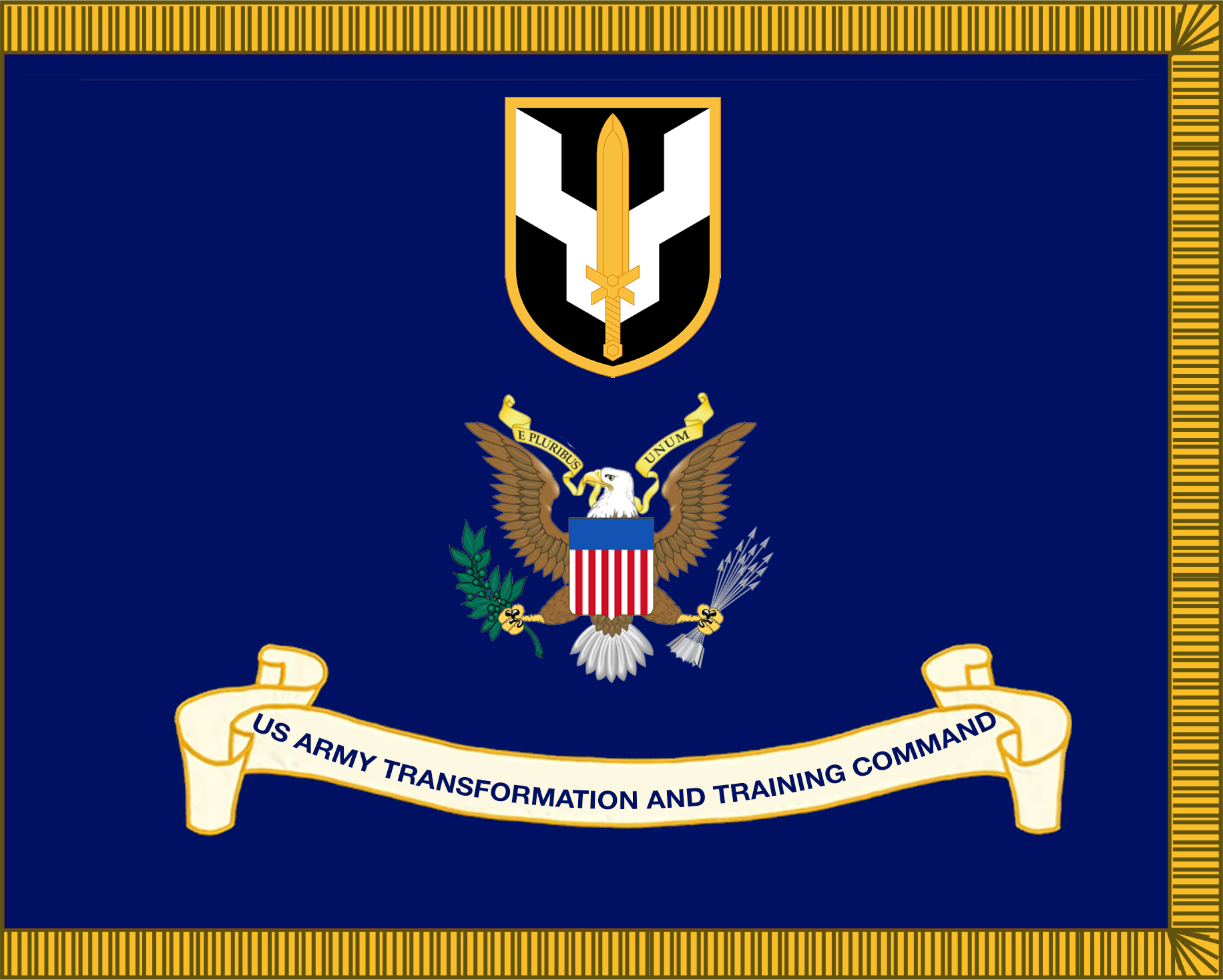
- Flag

The United States Army Transformation and Training Command (T2COM) is a major command of the United States Army headquartered in Austin, Texas, since October 2, 2025. T2COM unifies the functions of force design, force development and force generation, and is composed of approximately 350,000 personnel.

The command combined the United States Army Training and Doctrine Command (TRADOC) and the United States Army Futures Command (AFC). T2COM has three major subordinate units: the Futures and Concepts Command at Fort Eustis, Virginia; the Recruiting Command at Fort Knox, Kentucky; and the Combined Arms Command at Fort Leavenworth, Kansas.

At the establishment ceremony, Hodne explained the Army unified "force design, force development, and force generation." He added, “technology alone never transformed war. The tank, the airplane, the drone, none changed battlefields by themselves. It required new tactics, new concepts, and new organizations to integrate them into coherent warfighting systems.”

The consolidation was announced by the Army in May to meet requirements from Secretary of Defense Pete Hegseth to reduce the number of general officers and reduce redundancies. This new plan, the Army Transformation Initiative, is designed to transform and make a smaller force structure while focusing on "lethality" according to Secretary of the Army Daniel Driscoll. The initiative is also designed to downsize, consolidate, or close redundant headquarters, according to the secretary of defense.

== Organization ==
Elements:

- Army Software Factory (ASWF)
- T2COM Small Business Office

Force Generation:

- United States Army Recruiting Command (USAREC)
  - United States Army Recruiting Division
    - United States Army Recruiting and Retention College
  - Army Enterprise Marketing Office
  - United States Army Cadet Command
    - Junior Reserve Officers' Training Corps
  - 80th Training Command
  - Center for Initial Military Training
    - United States Army Basic Training
    - Holistic Health and Fitness (H2F)
    - United States Army Training Command
  - United States Army Drill Sergeant Academy

Force Development:

- United States Army Combined Arms Command (USACAC)
  - Fort Irwin National Training Center, Fort Irwin (NTC)
  - Joint Readiness Training Center, Fort Polk (JRTC)
  - Army University
    - United States Army War College
    - United States Army Noncommissioned Officer Academy (USANCOA)
      - Sergeants Major Academy
    - United States Army Center of Military History
  - Aviation Center of Excellence (AVCoE)
  - Cyber Center of Excellence (CCoE)
    - Cyber School
    - Signal School
    - United States Army Public Affairs School
  - Fires Center of Excellence (FCoE)
    - Field Artillery School
    - Air Defense Artillery School
  - Intelligence Center of Excellence (ICoE)
  - Maneuver Center of Excellence (MCoE)
    - Armor School
    - Infantry School
      - Officer Candidate School
  - Maneuver Support Center of Excellence (MSCoE)
    - Engineer School
    - Chemical, Biological, Radiological, and Nuclear (CBRN) School
    - Military Police School
  - Medical Center of Excellence (MEDCoE)
  - Mission Command Center of Excellence (MCCoE)
  - Sustainment Center of Excellence (SCoE) (Combined Arms Support Command (CASCOM))
    - Adjutant General School
    - Army Sustainment University
      - Logistics Leader College
      - College of Professional and Continuing Education
      - Army Sustainment (professional publication)
      - NCO Academy
        - Transportation
        - Ordnance
        - Quartermaster
    - Soldier Support Institute
    - Financial Management School
    - Ordnance School
    - Quartermaster School
      - Joint Culinary Center of Excellence
    - Transportation School
  - Space and Missile Defense Center of Excellence (SMDCoE)
  - The Special Operations Center of Excellence (SOCoE)

Force Design:

- United States Army Futures and Concepts Command (FCC)
  - United States Army Combat Capabilities Development Command (DEVCOM)
  - United States Army Medical Research and Development Command (MRDC)
  - United States Army Joint Modernization Command (JMC)
  - Transformation Decision Analysis Center (TDAC)
  - 75th Innovation Command

Direct supporting units:

- United States Army Test and Evaluation Command (ATEC)
- Army Applications Laboratory (AAL)
- Portfolio acquisition executives (PAEs)
  - PAE Agile Sustainment and Ammunition (AS&A)
  - PAE Command and Control/Counter-Command and Control (C2/CC2)
  - PAE Fires
  - PAE Layered Protection and CBRN Defense
  - PAE Maneuver Air
  - PAE Maneuver Ground

== Insignia ==
The new shoulder sleeve insignia was designed by the Army's Institute of Heraldry to show the merger of TRADOC and AFC. The patch is a black shield with a white downward "broken" chevron. Over the chevron is a gold sword. The colors are the official Army colors and the concept represents breaking old thinking to protect the force.

== List of commanding generals ==
Formerly Commanding General, United States Army Training and Doctrine Command, and Commanding General, United States Army Futures Command.

No.	Commanding General		Term		
No.	Portrait	Name	Took office	Left office	Term length
1	David M. Hodne	General; David M. Hodne	2 October 2025	2 April 2026	182 days
–	Edmond Brown	Lieutenant General; Edmond Brown; Acting	2 April 2026	Incumbent	227 days
