= United States Army Drill Sergeant Academy =

United States Army Drill Sergeants Academy (USADSA)
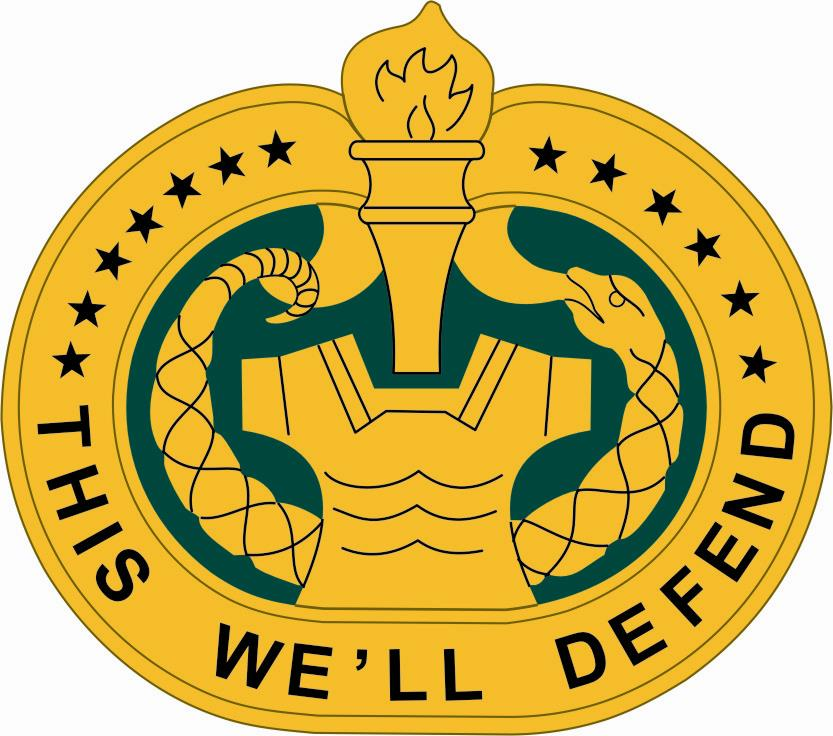
- Active: 1964-present
- Country: United States
- Branch: United States Army
- Role: Training Center
- Part of: United States Army Transformation and Training Command
- Garrison/HQ: Fort Jackson, South Carolina
- Motto: This We'll Defend
- Website: https://home.army.mil/jackson/units-tenants/USADSA#qt0:0

Commanders
- Commandant: CSM Joshua R. Bittle

The United States Army Drill Sergeant Academy (USADSA) is based at Fort Jackson, South Carolina and is the primary school for training non-commissioned officers to become U.S. Army drill instructors for Initial Entry Training (IET) which encompassed Basic Combat Training (BCT) and Advanced Individual Training (AIT).

== History ==
In 1962, Secretary of the Army Elvis J. Stahr ordered a study of recruit training. The study not only focused on the U.S. Army, but the Navy, Marines and Air Force as well. The report found that training NCOs were not well regarded. The report had five reasons for the lack of quality NCOs:

1. Long work hours.
2. Demanding nature of the work.
3. Lack of free time for family concerns.
4. Calibre of NCO’s being assigned to the army training centers.
5. Negative attitude of the trainers.

A pilot course for a new training concept for instructors was created at Fort Jackson and by September of 1964 a Drill Sergeant School began at Fort Leonard Wood, Missouri. A drill sergeant's identification badge was created in 1964 to help view being a drill instructor as an honor. In 1966 a second program was set up at Fort Dix, New Jersey.

The 1883 campaign hat - a brown four peak Boss of the Plains stetson was also adopted in 1964 as the mark of a drill sergeant.

In October of 1971, Chief of Staff of the Army William Westmoreland approved CONARC's request to allow female drill sergeants. In 1972 the first female drill sergeants took command of recruits wearing the Australian style bush hat.

At the end of a drill sergeant's tenure, they hold a de-hatting ceremony with a formal removal of the classic campaign hat to be replaced with a patrol cap. The standard term for a drill sergeant is three years.

Bravo Company Drill Sergeant Leaders welcome drilll sergeant candidates to the United States Army Drill Sergeant Academy Jan 24,2018.	SFC Albiter wears the old style green bush hat.	A U.S. Army Drill Sergeant Academy candidate receives his Drill Sergeant Identification Badge at Fort Jackson, S.C., March 27, 2025.	U.S. Army Staff Sgt. Vanessa Ortiz, a Drill Sergeant Leader assigned to the U.S. Army Drill Sergeant Academy, tries on a campaign hat at Fort Jackson, S.C., Nov. 24, 2025. The campaign hat became the official Drill Sergeant hat for females starting Jan. 2, 2026.

Previous to 1997, drill sergeants could be any sergeant grade, but the army limited the position to E-6 (staff sergeants) and higher. This was reversed in 2005 and remains until today.

The base realignment and closure commission (BRAC) Act consolidated all drill sergeant schools across the army to Fort Jackson.

In April 2024, the first United States Space Force guardians graduated from USADSA beginning a process for cross-branch training.

In January 2026, female drill sergeants began wearing the campaign hat and retired the bush style hat.
