= AFWERX =

American military technology incubator

Agency overview
- Formed: July 21, 2017
- Jurisdiction: United States Department of the Air Force
- Headquarters: Wright-Patterson Air Force Base, Ohio, U.S.
- Employees: 370
- Annual budget: $1.4 billion (annual)
- Agency executive: Col. Nathan C. Stuckey, Director and Chief Commercialization Officer
- Parent agency: Air Force Research Laboratory (AFRL)
- Child agencies: SpaceWERX; AFVentures
- Website: afwerx.com

AFWERX is a technology incubator and innovation arm of the United States Department of the Air Force, operating as a directorate within the Air Force Research Laboratory (AFRL). Established in 2017, its purpose is to accelerate the transition of technologies from small businesses and nontraditional defense contractors into operational use by the U.S. Air Force and the U.S. Space Force.

AFWERX primarily administers the Department of the Air Force's Small Business Innovation Research (SBIR) and Small Business Technology Transfer (STTR) programs. As of 2026, it has awarded approximately 10,400 contracts worth more than US$7.24 billion to startups and small businesses in the United States.

== History ==
AFWERX was announced by Secretary of the Air Force Heather Wilson on July 21, 2017, during a visit to Nellis Air Force Base. It was modeled in part on SOFWERX, a similar initiative established by United States Special Operations Command in 2016. It was initially supported through a partnership intermediary agreement with DefenseWerx (formerly the Doolittle Institute), a nonprofit based in Fort Walton Beach, Florida. Initial hubs were established in Las Vegas and Arlington, Virginia.

In 2021, AFWERX underwent a significant restructuring, consolidating five previously separate Department of the Air Force innovation programs under a single organization: SpaceWERX, the Air Force SBIR/STTR program, AFVentures, Spark (formerly AFWERX 1.0), and Prime (formerly Agility Prime). At the same time, AFWERX was formally aligned as a directorate under AFRL, while retaining reporting responsibilities to the Service Acquisition Executive. A further reorganization, referred to internally as AFWERX 3.0, was announced in late 2022, adding classified contracting capabilities and expanding the organization's contracting and civilian workforce.

== Organization ==
AFWERX operates as a directorate of the Air Force Research Laboratory, headquartered at Wright-Patterson Air Force Base, Ohio. As of 2024, it employs approximately 370 military, civilian, and contractor personnel across five hubs and sites, and executes an annual budget of approximately $1.4 billion. Its subordinate elements include:

AFVentures manages most SBIR/STTR contracting activity and administers the Strategic Funding Increase (STRATFI) and Tactical Funding Increase (TACFI) bridge-funding programs. STRATFI awards range from $3 million to $15 million; TACFI awards range from $375,000 to $2 million. Both require matching funds from government or private investors.

Spark supports grassroots innovation by Air Force and Space Force personnel, including the annual Spark Tank competition in which Airmen and Guardians pitch ideas to senior leadership. Prime works with industry partners to scale dual-use technologies toward full production. SpaceWERX is the space-focused division of AFWERX, aligned with the United States Space Force.

=== Funding and activities ===
AFWERX administers SBIR and STTR contracts across three phases: Phase I (initial feasibility), Phase II (prototype development), and Phase III (transition to operational use, funded outside SBIR/STTR). As of 2025, AFWERX has awarded approximately 10,400 SBIR/STTR contracts worth more than $7.24 billion to startups and small businesses.

The Program Year 2024 combined cohort for AFWERX and SpaceWERX accounted for $241 million in SBIR/STTR funds, $466 million in government matching funds, and $257 million in private matching funds.

=== Notable companies and projects ===
- Joby Aviation, received AFWERX funding and partnered with the DAF on electric vertical takeoff and landing (eVTOL) aircraft demonstrations, including a 2022 flight by U.S. Air Force pilots marking the first Airmen to fly an electric aircraft with military airworthiness certification.
- BETA Technologies, partnered with AFWERX Prime; its ALIA eVTOL aircraft was flown by Air Force pilots in March 2022 as part of the Agility Prime program.
- Disruptive Electronic Warfare Machines (DEWM), received a Direct-to-Phase II SBIR award for its Attritable Radar Target (DART) system, a man-portable radar threat emulator for electronic warfare training; delivered its 50th unit in 2025 and advanced to Phase III contracts for operational integration at Eglin Air Force Base.
- Orbital Sidekick, awarded a Phase I SBIR in 2018 and a subsequent STRATFI award of approximately $17 million for space-based hyperspectral intelligence analytics.
- OrbitFab, awarded a $12 million STRATFI contract to develop in-space refueling infrastructure described as "gas stations in space."
- Reflect Orbital, awarded a Phase II SBIR contract of $1.25 million in May 2025 for satellite-based sunlight redirection technology for on-demand illumination and energy resilience on critical Air Force operations.

== SpaceWERX ==
SpaceWERX is the space-focused division of AFWERX, serving as the innovation arm of the United States Space Force. It was formally established on August 19, 2021, following the creation of the United States Space Force in December 2019. It was organized to apply AFWERX funding mechanisms to space-specific technologies and to support Space Force acquisition priorities. Its budget has grown from approximately $30 million at inception to nearly $457 million annually as of 2024.

SpaceWERX is headquartered in Los Angeles, California, and employs approximately 40 military, civilian, and contractor personnel. It coordinates with Space Systems Command and its Commercial Space Office (COMSO) and has a budget of $460 million per year. Since its establishment, SpaceWERX has executed more than 900 contracts worth over $690 million.

=== Notable funded projects ===
- Varda Space Industries, awarded multiple SBIR contracts beginning in 2021 for in-space manufacturing of pharmaceuticals and optical fibers in low Earth orbit; later partnered with the Air Force to adapt its reentry capsules as hypersonic flight testbeds.
- Starfish Space, received 10 SBIR and 3 STTR contracts for its Otter spacecraft, designed for satellite servicing and debris removal; awarded a $37.5 million STRATFI contract in 2024.
- K2 Space, awarded a $60 million STRATFI contract in fiscal year 2024 for large-format satellite technology.
- VICTUS HAZE, A 2024 tactically responsive space demonstration mission conducted in partnership with Space Systems Command and the Defense Innovation Unit, designed to demonstrate the ability to deploy a space vehicle within 24 hours of tasking and achieve operational readiness within 48 hours of reaching orbit.
  - True Anomaly, received a $30 million emergent need SBIR contract through SpaceWERX for its Jackal rendezvous and proximity operation-capable spacecraft and command and control center; True Anomaly contributed an additional $30 million in private capital to the effort.
  - Rocket Lab, received a $32 million contract through the Defense Innovation Unit to design, build, launch, and operate a rendezvous and proximity operation-capable spacecraft using its Electron launch vehicle.
- Orbital Prime, a program supporting on-orbit servicing, assembly, and manufacturing (OSAM) with an initial emphasis on active debris removal.

== See also ==
- Small Business Innovation Research
- DARPA
- Air Force Research Laboratory
- Defense Innovation Unit
- Marine Innovation Unit
- 75th Innovation Command (Army)
