= United States Army Public Affairs School =

- Active: 15 October 2026-present
- Country: United States
- Branch: U.S. Army
- Type: School
- Role: Public Affairs
- Garrison/HQ: Fort Meade, Maryland
- Motto: ENGAGE INFORM

Commanders
- Current commander: Col. Kamil Sztalkoper
- Command Sergeant Major: CSM Kimberly Cooper

The United States Army Public Affairs School (USAPAS) is a school that develops Public Affairs Functional Area 46 soldiers in public affairs and visual information skills to support of the Army and joint force. The school develops doctrine, organization, training, materiel, leadership and education, personnel, and facilities requirements related to the public affairs. The school opened in 15 October 2026. The school is assigned to the Transformation and Training Command at Fort Meade, Maryland. Col. Kamil Sztalkoper is the first commandant.

At USAPAS, public affairs soldiers (including reservists and National Guardsmen) learn how to take photos, write press releases, manage social media accounts and relay information to journalists, among other tasks. The school will also recommend specific equipment requirements and operational policies across the Army.

== History ==
In 1946, the U.S. Army Information School was the first military school created specifically to standardize training for public information, troop information, and education duties. By 1964, the Defense Information School (DINFOS) was established to support joint training in the Public Affairs field across multiple branches.

In 1980, Training and Doctrine Command oversaw DINFOS in establishing the Public Affairs Proponent Activity (PAPA) for Army doctrine development. In 1992, PAPA was reassigned to the Office of the Chief of Public Affairs at Department of the Army headquarters (HQDA), and in 1999 it was redesignated as the Army Public Affairs Center (APAC).

Army General Order 2025-09 was published on April 17, 2025, to disestablish APAC and establish the U.S. Army Public Affairs School and Army Proponent Office – Public Affairs (APO-PA) and realign the organization under TRADOC (now Army Transformation and Training Command).

== Insignia ==
The regimental DUI was authorized on 23 June 2026. The design is an Azure teal blue field on a rectangular shield. Above is a Azure blue sword on a Silver Gray chief that ends in pen nibs. In the center is an open book surmounted by an organe lightning bolt. The scroll below is black with silver lettering of the motto: ENGAGE INFORM.

Courses offered at USAPAS:

Initial Entry Training

- Mass Communication Foundations Course
- Mass Communication Systems Engineer Course
- MCF - Graphic Design
- MCF - Visual Documentation

Intermediate Courses

- Digital Multimedia Course
- Intermediate Motion Media Course
- Intermediate Public Affairs Specialist Course
- Intermediate Photojournalism Course
- Joint Contingency Public Affairs Course
- Visual Information Management Course

Officer Qualification Training

- Public Affairs & Communication Strategy Qualification Course
- Public Affairs & Communication Strategy Qualification Course - Distance Learning
