= Joint Mission System =

Joint Mission System is a USSF/USAF space command and control system. It has had a troubled development, through phases called Increment 2 and 3. Also called, e.g. by ESA, the JSpOC (Joint Space Operations Center) Mission System (JMS).

== Description ==
The Joint Mission System (JMS) is a program used by the Joint Functional Component Command for Space (JFCC SPACE) that provides net-centric services and databases, which are intended to improve space situational command, control and awareness.

The JFCC SPACE used the JMS in five areas of operations:

- Space Object Identification
- Spectrum Characterization
- Launch/Reentry Support
- Joint Forces Support
- Support to Contingency Operations

== History ==
The JSpOC JMS dates back to 1982 when the first attempts for a stand-alone Space Situational Awareness (SSA) process was done with the creation of the Space Defence Operations Center (SPADOC) System Operational Requirements Document (SWORD). In 2010, the JMS Capability Description Document (CDD) was established which led to the 2011 JMS Functional Requirements Document (FRD). Increment 1 was completed in October 2012 when operational tests and trail period began. An Operational Utility Evaluation (OUE) was conducted from November 2012 until January 2013 then the final test results were published in a report on 19 February 2013. The report informed the Air Force of the operational acceptance of Increment 1 and opened the opportunity for acquiring Increment 2. Increment 2 which was to be completed in 2016, was intended to replace the legacy SPADOC and Astrodynamics Support Workstation (ASW) capabilities and was to be delivered in three Service Packs (SP). Increment 3 was to be created to continue to provide SSA required to develop new applications starting in 2017. The three SP's in Increment 2 were SP-7, for updates to Increment 1, SP-9, for JMS hardware and software expansions, and SP-11, making Increment 2 functional at a Top Secret level. In 2014, SP-7 was completed and operationally accepted by the Air Force.

In August 2016, the Air Force completed a Critical Change review of JMS Increment 2 which ended in a deferred final delivery from July 2016 to May 2019. From March until May 2018, the Air Force Operational Test and Evaluation Center (AFROTEC) completed testing of Increment 2, SP-9, after which was not approved suitable for operation and because of this, SP-11 was put on hold.

In December 2021, the Space System Command's Space Command and Control program decommissioned the JMS SP-9 significant program progress was made to advance overall Space Domain Awareness (SDA) capabilities.

== See also ==
- Space Operations Command (SpOC)
