= Defense Innovation Unit =

US Department of Defense organization

- Seal

- Logo

- Flag

Agency overview
- Formed: August 2015
- Agency executive: Owen West, Director
- Parent department: United States Department of Defense (Field Activity)
- Website: diu.mil

The Defense Innovation Unit (DIU), also called Unit X, is a United States Department of Defense (DoD) organization founded to help the U.S. military make faster use of emerging commercial technologies. Launched in 2015, the organization has been called "the Pentagon's Innovation Experiment". DIU is staffed by civilian and both active duty and reserve military personnel. The organization is headquartered in Mountain View, California – Silicon Valley – with offices in Austin, Boston, Chicago, and the Pentagon just outside Washington, D.C.

== Mission ==
The DIU's mission is to accelerate DoD adoption of commercial technology, transform military capacity and capability, and strengthen the American national security innovation base.

It seeks to strengthen US national security by accelerating the adoption of commercial technology throughout the military and growing the national security innovation base. DIU partners with organizations across the Department of Defense, from the services and components to combatant commands and defense agencies, to rapidly prototype and field advanced commercial products that address national security challenges.

DIU operates six portfolios dedicated to solving national security demand in AI/ML (artificial intelligence/machine learning), Autonomy, Cyber, Human Systems, Energy, and Space. In 2016, DIU, then known as DIUx, pioneered a process called the 'Commercial Solutions Opening' (CSO) created by Lauren Dailey, David Rothzeid, and Robert Trejo along with a group of contracting officers from Army Contracting Command (ACC-NJ) for awarding prototype contracts through the use of Other Transaction Authority (OTA) leveraging 10 U.S. Code § 4022 (formerly § 2371b) for competitive selection of advanced commercial technologies. After rapid prototyping, the resulting material can be transitioned and scaled through production OT (2371b(f)) agreements or other follow-on contracts for units and organizations that find utility with the prototyping effort.

== Leaders ==
DIU was launched in August 2015 as "Defense Innovation Unit Experimental (DIUx)." It was founded by then-secretary of defense Ash Carter; in May 2016, Carter announced a reboot of the organization, directing that it report directly to his office, and that a second office would open in Boston.

From May 2016 to February 2018, its managing partner was Raj Shah, a Wharton MBA graduate who flew F-16s in Iraq as an Air National Guard reservist and cofounded Morta Security, later acquired by Palo Alto Networks. Other leaders include Isaac Taylor, Chris Kirchhoff, Vishaal Hariprasad, and Ajay Amlani. Taylor spent 13 years at Google, designing and building its first self-driving cars, then later rising to operations director of Google X, where he started projects involving robotics and augmented reality. Kirchhoff served as a strategist in President Obama's National Security Council and as the civilian assistant to General Martin Dempsey, Chairman of the Joint Chiefs of Staff. Hariprasad is a highly decorated Air Force cyberwarfare officer who cofounded Morta Security with Raj Shah. Amlani is a former White House Fellow and cofounder of the airport security service CLEAR, who co-led many of DIU's autonomy and software initiatives.

In August 2017, when Captain Sean Heritage, USN, was interim director, the Deputy Secretary of Defense directed DIUx to be re-designated as the Defense Innovation Unit (DIU) to indicate the organization's permanence within the Department of Defense.

On September 24, 2018, Michael Brown took over as DIU's Managing Director. In April 2021, Brown was originally going to be President Joe Biden's nominee for chief weapons buyer for the Department of Defense when news broke that he was under investigation by the Department of Defense Office of Inspector General over alleged breaches of federal hiring rules at the DIU. Brown withdrew his name from consideration shortly afterward. Brown left his position as managing director on September 2, 2022. On September 9, 2022, the DoD Inspector General found the allegations to be unsubstantiated.

Doug Beck then became the new director of DIU, reporting directly to the Secretary of Defense as of April 4, 2023. Before joining DIU, Beck was Vice President at Apple from 2009 to 2023. At Apple, Beck co-led the worldwide business development and sales functions and led the company's businesses across Northeast Asia and the Americas. Beck also served in the Navy Reserves for 26 years in Iraq and Afghanistan and extensively throughout the Asia Pacific. In his previous experience with DIU, Beck founded and led its joint reserve component for four years. Beck resigned in August 2025.

In January 2026, the Department of War announced Owen West, who served as Assistant Secretary of Defense for Special Operations and Low-Intensity Conflict in the first Trump administration, as DIU director.

== Contract awards ==
- In November 2024, national security company Vannevar Labs signed a production contract worth up to $99 million with the Defense Innovation Unit, to expand its technology to more military units.
- In March 2025 DIU, awarded Firefly Aerospace a contract to use three to six Elytra Dawn vehicles as part of its "Sinequone" project.

== See also ==
- Defense Innovation Advisory Board
- Marine Innovation Unit
- AFWERX (Air Force) and SpaceWERX (Space Force)
- 75th Innovation Command (Army)
