= Ngrep =

Packet analyser

ngrep
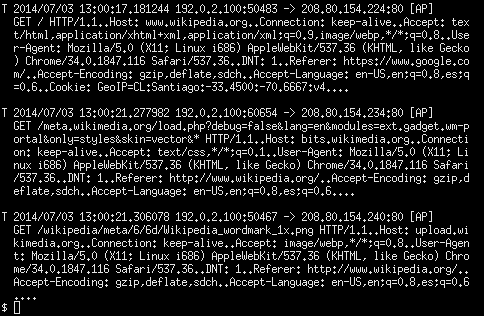
- ngrep console output
- Developer: Jordan Ritter
- Stable release: 1.49.0 / 8 February 2026; 4 months ago
- Written in: C
- Operating system: Linux, Solaris, illumos FreeBSD, NetBSD, OpenBSD, Mac OS X, additional *NIX systems, Windows
- Type: Packet analyzer
- License: BSD-style
- Website: https://github.com/jpr5/ngrep
- Repository: github.com/jpr5/ngrep

ngrep (network grep) is a network packet analyzer written by Jordan Ritter. It has a command-line interface, and relies upon the pcap library and the GNU regex library.

ngrep supports Berkeley Packet Filter (BPF) logic to select network sources or destinations or protocols, and also allows matching patterns or regular expressions in the data payload of packets using GNU grep syntax, showing packet data in a human-friendly way.

ngrep is an open source application, and the source code is available to download from the ngrep site on GitHub. It can be compiled and ported to multiple platforms, it works in many UNIX-like operating systems: Linux, Solaris, illumos, BSD, AIX, and also works on Microsoft Windows.

== Functionality ==
ngrep is similar to tcpdump, but it has the ability to look for a regular expression in the payload of the packet, and show the matching packets on a screen or console. It allows users to see all unencrypted traffic being passed over the network, by putting the network interface into promiscuous mode.

ngrep with an appropriate BPF filter syntax, can be used to debug plain text protocols interactions like HTTP, SMTP, FTP, DNS, among others, or to search for a specific string or pattern, using a grep regular expression syntax.

ngrep also can be used to capture traffic on the wire and store pcap dump files, or to read files generated by other sniffer applications like tcpdump or wireshark.

ngrep has various options or command line arguments. The ngrep man page in UNIX-like operating systems show a list of available options.

== Using ngrep ==
In these examples, it is assumed that eth0 is the used network interface.

- Capture network traffic incoming/outgoing to/from eth0 interface and show parameters following HTTP (TCP/80) GET or POST methods

ngrep -l -q -d eth0 -i "^GET |^POST " tcp and port 80

- Capture network traffic incoming/outgoing to/from eth0 interface and show the HTTP (TCP/80) User-Agent string

ngrep -l -q -d eth0 -i "User-Agent: " tcp and port 80

- Capture network traffic incoming/outgoing to/from eth0 interface and show the DNS (UDP/53) querys and responses

ngrep -l -q -d eth0 -i "" udp and port 53

== Security ==
Capturing raw network traffic from an interface requires special privileges or superuser privileges on some platforms, especially on Unix-like systems. ngrep default behavior is to drop privileges in those platforms, running under a specific unprivileged user.

Like tcpdump, it is also possible to use ngrep for the specific purpose of intercepting and displaying the communications of another user or computer, or an entire network.

A privileged user running ngrep in a server or workstation connected to a device configured with port mirroring on a switch, router, or gateway, or connected to any other device used for network traffic capture on a LAN, MAN, or WAN, can watch all unencrypted information related to login ID's, passwords, or URLs and content of websites being viewed in that network.

== Supported protocols ==
- IPv4 and IPv6, Internet Protocol version 4 and version 6
- TCP, Transmission Control Protocol
- UDP, User Datagram Protocol
- ICMPv4 and ICMPv6, Internet Control Message Protocol version 4 and version 6
- IGMP, Internet Group Management Protocol
- Ethernet, IEEE 802.3
- PPP, Point to Point Protocol
- SLIP, Serial Line Internet Protocol
- FDDI, Fiber Data Distribution Protocol
- Token Ring, IEEE 802.5

== See also ==
- Comparison of packet analyzers
- snoop, a command line packet analyzer included with Solaris and illumos
- dsniff, a packet sniffer and set of traffic analysis tools
- netsniff-ng, a free Linux networking toolkit
- etherape, a network mapping tool that relies on sniffing traffic
- tcptrace, a tool for analyzing the logs produced by tcpdump
- Microsoft Network Monitor, a packet analyzer
- xplico, a network forensics analysis tool
