= Bit-Twist =

- Original author: Addy Yeow
- Stable release: 4.7 / November 1, 2024
- Operating system: Windows, Linux, FreeBSD, NetBSD, OpenBSD, macOS
- Type: Packet generator
- License: GNU General Public License
- Website: bittwist.sourceforge.io

Bit-Twist is a powerful libpcap-based Ethernet packet generator and packet capture editor, written in POSIX-compliant C, designed to complement tcpdump by replaying captured traffic from pcap files onto live networks. It supports Windows (using Npcap), Linux, BSD, and macOS, allowing the editing of key fields in Ethernet, ARP, IPv4, IPv6, ICMP, and TCP/UDP headers. It can also generate pcap files from its built-in templates, enabling packet creation without existing capture files, along with payload generation from uniformly distributed random bytes or fixed bytes, such as hex streams from Wireshark. Ideal for testing firewalls, IDS, IPS, routers, switches, load balancers, and other network equipment, it delivers performance that matches the line rate of NIC, up to 10Gbps.
