= Sparrowiq =

SparrowIQ is a packet-based traffic analysis and network performance monitoring solution that provides network managers with near real-time traffic visibility into network usage based on conversations, applications, users and class of service.

The product was developed by Solana Networks (Ottawa, Ontario, Canada) to allow smaller businesses to gain access to flow-based network traffic monitoring solutions - normally too complex or unaffordable.

SparrowIQ was awarded the "Best New Product" by the ASCII Group in June 2015 and "Strong Value" award by Enterprise Management Associates in 2013.

== Features ==
SparrowIQ key features

- Traffic Forensics for identifying business-relevant versus recreational and unauthorized traffic
- Real-time Traffic Alerting for instant notification when bandwidth crosses preset thresholds
- Automatic Report Generation and Distribution
