= Tcptrace =

TCP dump file analyzer

tcptrace is a free and open-source tool for analyzing TCP dump files. It accepts as input files produced by packet-capture programs, including tcpdump, Wireshark, and snoop.

tcptrace can produce several different types of output containing information on each connection seen, such as elapsed time, bytes and segments sent and received, retransmissions, round trip times, window advertisements, and throughput. It can also produce graphs for further analysis. As of version 5, minimal UDP processing has been implemented in addition to the TCP capabilities.

== See also ==
- dsniff
- EtherApe
- netsniff-ng
- Ngrep
- tcpdump
- Wireshark
