= Namebench =

- Developer(s): Google
- Initial release: 20 August 2009; 15 years ago
- Stable release: 1.3.1 / 6 June 2010; 14 years ago
- Platform: Microsoft Windows, OS X and Unix
- Size: Windows: 5.0 MB; OS X: 1.3 MB; Source: 1.1 MB
- Licence: Apache License, version 2.0
- Website: code.google.com/archive/p/namebench/

Namebench is an open-source Domain Name System (DNS) benchmark utility by Google, Inc, which is licensed under the Apache License, version 2.0. Namebench runs on Windows, OS X, and Unix. It is available with a graphical user interface as well as a command-line interface. Its purpose is to find the fastest DNS server one could use. The project began as a 20% project at Google. It can run the benchmark using your web browser history, tcpdump output, or standardized datasets, in order to provide an individualized recommendation. Namebench was written using open-source tools and libraries. It was created by Google engineer Thomas Stromberg.
