= Packet Sender =

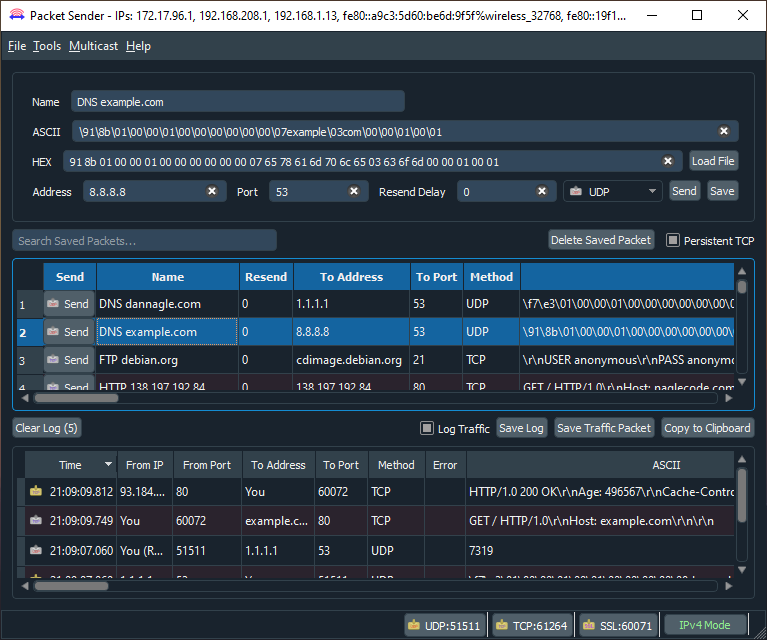
- Packet Sender GUI
- Original author(s): Dan Nagle
- Stable release: v8.9.1 / June 28, 2025; 26 days ago
- Written in: C++
- Operating system: Cross-platform
- Type: Packet generator
- License: GPL v2
- Website: packetsender.com

Packet Sender is an open source utility to allow sending and receiving TCP and UDP packets. It also supports TCP connections using SSL, intense traffic generation, HTTP(S) GET/POST requests, and panel generation. It is available for Windows, Mac, and Linux. It is licensed GNU General Public License v2 and is free software. Packet Sender's web site says "It's designed to be very easy to use while still providing enough features for power users to do what they need.".

== Uses ==
Typical applications of Packet Sender include:

- Troubleshooting network devices that use network servers (send a packet and then analyze the response)
- Troubleshooting network devices that use network clients (devices that "phone home" via UDP, TCP, or SSL—Packet Sender can capture these requests)
- Testing and development of new network protocols (send a packet, see if device behaves appropriately)
- Reverse-engineering network protocols for security analysis (such as malware)
- Troubleshooting secure connections (using the SSL server and client).
- Automation (via Packet Sender's command line interface or resend feature)
- Stress-testing a device (using intense network generator tool)
- Sharing/Saving/Collaboration using the Packet Sender Cloud service

Packet Sender comes with a built-in TCP, UDP, SSL, DTLS server on multiple ports a user specifies. This remains running listening for packets while sending other packets.

== Features ==
As of version v8.1.1 Packet Sender supports the following features:

- Live traffic log (Time / From IP / From Port / To IP / Method / Error / ASCII / HEX)
- Persistent TCP and SSL Connections
- HTTP Requests with Auth headers
- Portable Mode
- IPv6 Client / Server
- IPv4 Subnet Calculator
- Saved packets (with sending directly from saved list)
- Mixed ASCII packet notation (ASCII with embedded syntax to allow hex)
- Multiple TCP servers
- Multiple UDP servers
- Multiple SSL servers
- Multiple DTLS servers
- Multicast send and receive
- Packet resending at n intervals (where n is seconds)
- Multi-threaded TCP/SSL/DTLS connections
- Command-line interface
- Packet responses
- Smart Packet responses
- Macros inside packet responses for TIME, DATE, UNIXTIME, RANDOM, UNIQUE
- Packet search (for saved packets)
- Packet export/import
- Intense Traffic Generator (UDP Flooding) via GUI or CLI
- Quick-send from traffic log
- Save traffic log
- Panel Generation for scripting buttons
- Packet Sender Cloud

== Platforms ==
- Windows (64-bit)
- OS X (Intel-based x86-64 or ARM-based Macs)
- Linux (Source Distribution with Qt or x86-64 AppImage or Snap)

Packet Sender Mobile is available on iOS. It only has the core features of desktop Packet Sender (send, receive, TCP, UDP, and Cloud).

== See also ==
- Hping
- Wireshark
- Netcat
