= Packet generator =

A packet generator or packet builder is a type of software that generates random packets or allows the user to construct detailed custom packets. Depending on the network medium and operating system, packet generators utilize raw sockets, NDIS function calls, or direct access to the network adapter kernel-mode driver.

This is useful for testing implementations of IP stacks for bugs and security vulnerabilities.

== Comparison ==
=== General Information ===
Title	Author	OS	Interface	Link	License
AnetTest	Anton Titov	Windows, Unix	CLI	AnetTest	GPL
Bit-Twist	Addy Yeow	Windows, Linux, BSD, Mac OS X	CLI	Bit-Twist	GPLv2
Cat Karat packet builder	Valery Diomin, Yakov Tetruashvili	Windows	GUI	Cat Karat packet builder	Packet Builder License
Colasoft Packet Builder	Colasoft	Windows	GUI	Colasoft Packet Builder	Packet Builder License: Freeware
CommView Packet Generator	TamoSoft	Windows	GUI	For Ethernet For Wi-Fi	Proprietary EULA
IP Sorcery	Josiah Zayner	Unix	CLI and GUI	IP Sorcery	GPL
Nemesis	Jeff Nathan	Windows, Unix	CLI	Nemesis	BSD
Ostinato	Srivats P	Windows, Linux, BSD, Mac OS X	GUI and API		GPLv3
Packet Construction Set	George Neville-Neil	Linux, BSD, Mac OS X	CLI	PCS	BSD-like
Packet Sender	Dan Nagle	Windows, Linux, Mac OS X	CLI and GUI	Packet Sender	GPLv2
Pktgen	Linux Foundation	Linux	CLI	Pktgen	GPLv2
packETH	Miha Jemec	Linux	GUI and CLI	packETH	GPLv3
pierf	Pieter Blommaert	Windows(Cygwin)/Linux	CLI	pierf	free BSD
rain	Michael Behan	Linux, *BSD	CLI	rain	free GPLv2
Scapy	Philippe BIONDI	Linux/Unix/Windows	CLI	Scapy	GPLv2
targa3	Mixter	Linux, Unix	CLI	targa3	?
UMPA	Adriano Monteiro Marques	Cross-platform (Python)	?	UMPA	GPLv2
trafgen	Daniel Borkmann	Linux	CLI	netsniff-ng	GPLv2
xcap	cxxxap	Windows	GUI	xcap	Free
Simple Packet Sender (SPS)	h0h1r4um	Linux	GUI	SPS	GPLv3
WARP17	Juniper Networks	Linux	CLI and API	WARP17	BSD
Wirefloss	Wirefloss	Web page	GUI	Wirefloss	Free

== See also ==
- Packet crafting
- Packet analyzer
- Packetsquare
