= Vern Paxson =

American computer scientist

Vern Edward Paxson
- Scientific career
- Fields: Computer science
- Institutions: UC Berkeley College of Engineering

Vern Edward Paxson is a professor of computer science at the University of California, Berkeley. He also leads the Networking and Security Group at the International Computer Science Institute in Berkeley, California. His interests range from transport protocols to intrusion detection and worms. He is an active member of the Internet Engineering Task Force (IETF) community and served as the chair of the IRTF from 2001 until 2005. From 1998 to 1999 he served on the IESG as Transport Area Director for the IETF.

In 2006 Paxson was inducted as a Fellow of the Association for Computing Machinery (ACM). The ACM's Special Interest Group on Data Communications (SIGCOMM) gave Paxson its 2011 award, "for his seminal contributions to the fields of Internet measurement and Internet security, and for distinguished leadership and service to the Internet community." The annual SIGCOMM Award recognizes lifetime contribution to the field of communication networks.

Paxson is also the original author of the flex lexical analyzer and the Zeek intrusion detection system. Backscatter is a term coined by Vern Paxson to describe Internet background noise resulting from a DDoS attack using multiple spoofed addresses.

Paxson earned a PhD in 1997 at Berkeley under Domenico Ferrari.
