= WhatPulse =

Key-counting computer program

- Screenshot from WhatPulse 2.3.1
- Developer: Martijn Smit
- Release: 6 February 2003; 23 years ago
- Stable release: 6.1 / 27 March 2026; 7 months ago
- Preview release: 6.2 beta 1 / 8 April 2026; 6 months ago
- Written in: C++
- Operating system: Microsoft Windows; macOS; Linux
- Platform: Qt
- Type: Usage statistics (Key & mouse click counting, bandwidth and uptime measuring)
- License: Freeware
- Website: whatpulse.org

WhatPulse is a key-counting program that monitors computer uptime, bandwidth usage and the number of keystrokes and mouse clicks made by a user over a period of time. Unlike keyloggers, the authors claim WhatPulse does not record the order in which keys are pressed but instead counts the number of times keys are pressed. As of June 24, 2025, over 418,000+ users are active on WhatPulse.

== Features ==
The software tracks a user's pressed keys, mouse clicks and used bandwidth and the uptime of the system. Periodically, the user can upload to the server the number of keystrokes made; this is called "pulsing". Users can see where they are in a leaderboard of people who have joined the program and compare themselves against people from their own countries. Users can also join teams, which enables them to compare themselves against people with similar interests.

The program also has anti-cheat measures in place. Automated measures against cheating include a 50 keys per second maximum.

== Platform compatibility ==
WhatPulse is a freeware cross-platform application, running on Windows, macOS, and Linux. However, the Mac and Linux clients were not always updated as often as the Windows client. This changed in version 2.0, which became available for all platforms at the same time and aims at letting the client act the same across all platforms.
