= Network tap =

Hardware device to access the data flowing across a computer network

A network tap is a system that monitors events on a local network. A tap is typically a dedicated hardware device that provides a way to access the data flowing across a computer network.

The network tap has (at least) three ports: an A port, a B port, and a monitor port. A tap inserted between A and B passes all traffic (send and receive data streams) through unimpeded in real time, but also copies that same data to its monitor port, enabling a third party to listen.

Network taps are commonly used for network intrusion detection systems, VoIP recording, network probes, RMON probes, packet sniffers, and other monitoring and collection devices and software that require access to a network segment. Taps are used in security applications because they are non-obtrusive, are not detectable on the network (having no physical or logical address), can deal with full-duplex and non-shared networks, and will usually pass through or bypass traffic even if the tap stops working or loses power.

== Terminology ==
The term network tap is analogous to phone tap or vampire tap. Some vendors define TAP as an acronym for test access point or terminal access point; however, those are backronyms.

The monitored traffic is sometimes referred to as the pass-through traffic, while the ports that are used for monitoring are the monitor ports. There may also be an aggregation port for full-duplex traffic, wherein the A traffic is aggregated with the B traffic, resulting in one stream of data for monitoring the full-duplex communication. The packets must be aligned into a single stream using a time-of-arrival algorithm.

Vendors will tend to use terms in their marketing such as breakout, passive, aggregating, regeneration, bypass, active, inline power, and others. Unfortunately, vendors do not use such terms consistently. Before buying any product, it is important to understand the available features and check with vendors or read the product literature closely to figure out how marketing terms correspond to reality. All of the "vendor terms" are common within the industry, have real definitions and are valuable points of consideration when buying a tap device.

A distributed tap is a set of network taps that report to a centralized monitoring system or packet analyzer.

== Tapping technology methods ==
There are various methods for monitoring a network. Many tapping methods can be used, according to the network technology, the monitoring objective, the resources available and the size of the target network. Various methods will be developed below.

=== Tapping by software ===
This type of tapping focuses on tapping by making use of software, and without making any significant change to an infrastructure's hardware. This type of tapping is often the cheapest one to implement, but it needs several implementations to give a truly complete look of the network.

==== Monitoring software ====
The simplest type of monitoring is logging into an interesting device and running programs or commands that show performance statistics and other data. This is the cheapest way to monitor a network, and is highly appropriate for small networks. However, it does not scale well to large networks. It can also impact the network being monitored; see observer effect.

==== SNMP ====
Another way to monitor devices is to use a remote management protocol such as SNMP to ask devices about their performance. This scales well, but is not necessarily appropriate for all types of monitoring. The inherent problems with SNMP are the polling effect. Many vendors have alleviated this by using intelligent polling schedulers, but this may still affect the performance of the device being monitored. It also opens up a host of potential security problems.

==== Port mirroring ====
Another method to monitor networks is to use port mirroring (called "SPAN", for Switched Port Analyzer, by vendors such as Cisco, and given other names, such MLXe telemetry by Brocade Communications and other vendors)(also known as MIRROR port) or a monitoring protocol such as TZSP on routers and switches. This is a low-cost alternative to network taps and solves many of the same problems. However, not all routers and switches support port mirroring, and, on those that do, using port mirroring can affect the performance of the router or switch. These technologies may also be subject to the problem with full-duplex described elsewhere in this article, and there are often limits for the router or switch on how many pass-through sessions can be monitored, or how many monitor ports (generally two) can monitor a given session. Often, when the SPAN port is overloaded, packets will be dropped before reaching the monitoring device. There is also the possibility of losing some of the error packets that may be causing problems. If this data is not sent to the monitoring device because it is dropped, it is impossible to troubleshoot, no matter how advanced the device that is used.

==== Promiscuous sniffer ====
This tapping method consists of enabling promiscuous mode on the device that is used for the monitoring and attaching it to a network hub. This works well with older LAN technologies such as 10BASE2, FDDI, and Token Ring. On such networks, any host can automatically see what all other hosts are doing by enabling promiscuous mode. However, modern switched network technologies create point-to-point links between pairs of devices, making it impossible to tap network traffic with this method.

=== Tapping by hardware ===
This type of tap uses a dedicated hardware device inserted directly into the physical network connection, such as an Ethernet or fiber-optic cable, to passively copy data as it passes between two devices, without altering the traffic or adding processing load to the network equipment being monitored.

==== In-line sniffer ====
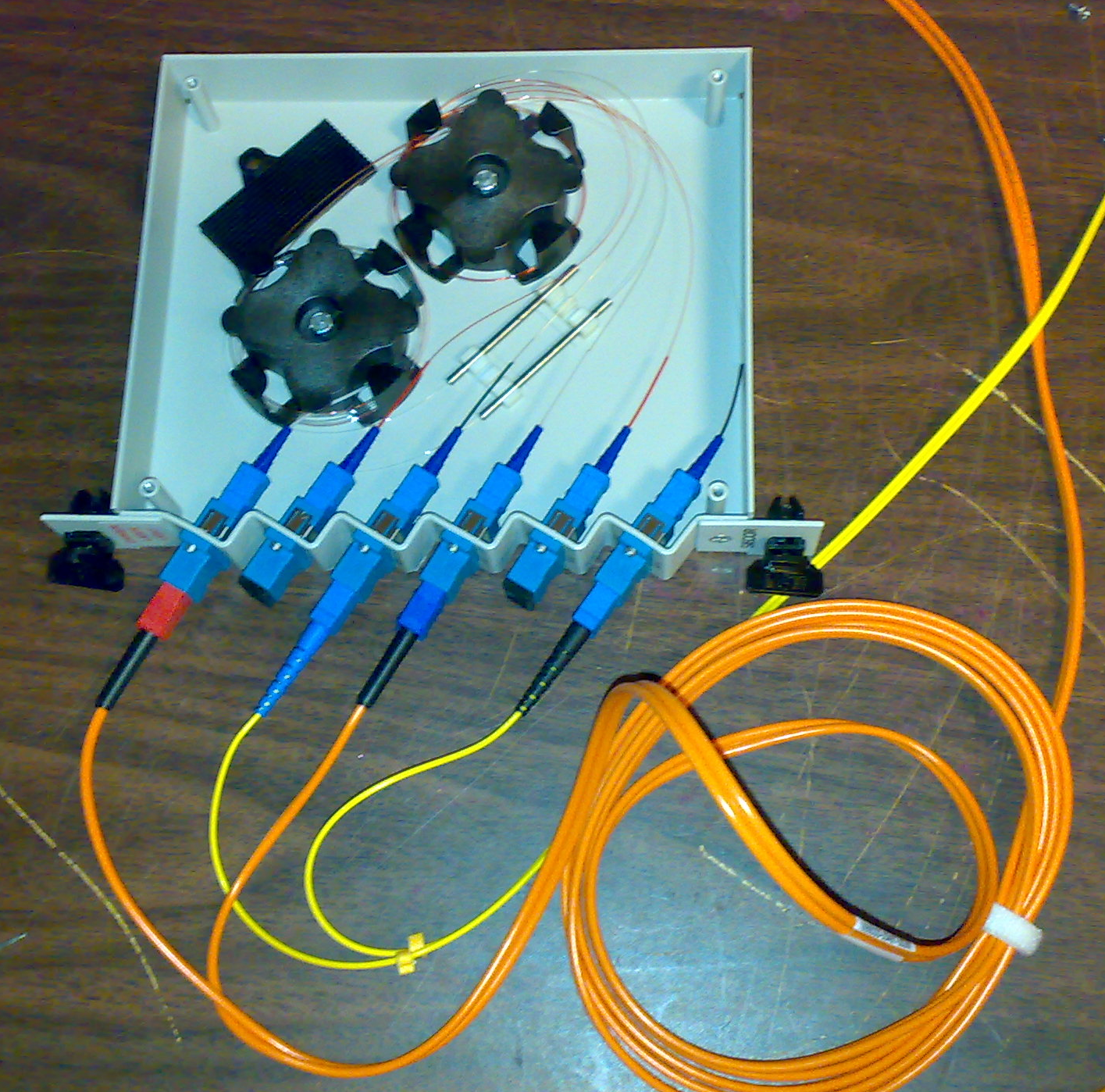
A passive fiber optic tap

This method consists of the installation of a monitoring device between a network cable and the device the admin or attacker wishes to tap. The victim device might stop receiving traffic if the monitoring device fails or is updating or rebooting.

Some taps, particularly fiber taps, use no power and no electronics at all for the pass-through and monitor portion of the network traffic. This means that the tap should never suffer any kind of electronics failure or power failure that results in a loss of network connectivity. One way this can work, for fiber-based network technologies, is that the tap divides the incoming light using a simple physical apparatus into two outputs, one for the pass-through, one for the monitor. This can be called a passive tap. Other taps use no power or electronics for the pass-through, but do use power and electronics for the monitor port. These can also be referred to as passive.

=== V-Line tapping ===
V-Line tapping (also known as bypass tapping) is the most important tapping system method. V-Line Tapping allows placing the served system virtually in-line. Putting this device in-line will compromise the integrity of a critical network. By placing a Tapping system instead of the monitoring device and connecting the monitoring device to the Tapping system, it can guarantee that the traffic will continue to flow and the device will not create a failure point in the network. This method always passes every packet, even error packets that a SPAN port may drop, to the monitoring device. This method involves using spying software on the target machine. For a system administrator, this type of solution is the easiest to implement and the most cost-effective one; However, for an attacker, this type of tapping is very risky, as this is easily detectable by system scans. The tapping system will be removed after a reboot if the spying software was installed in a non-persistent way on a system that is executing a Live-OS.

== Advantages and features ==
Modern network technologies are often full-duplex, meaning that data can travel in both directions at the same time. If a network link allows 100 Mbit/s of data to flow in each direction at the same time, this means that the network really allows 200 Mbit/s of aggregate throughput. This can present a problem for monitoring technologies if they have only one monitor port. Therefore, network taps for full-duplex technologies usually have two monitor ports, one for each half of the connection. The listener must use channel bonding or link aggregation to merge the two connections into one aggregate interface to see both halves of the traffic. Other monitoring technologies, such as passive fiber network TAPs, do not deal well with full-duplex traffic.

Once a network tap is in place, the network can be monitored without interfering with the network itself. Other network monitoring solutions require in-band changes to network devices, which means that monitoring can impact the devices being monitored. This scenario is for active, inline security tools, such as next-generation firewalls, intrusion prevention systems and web application firewalls.

Once a tap is in place, a monitoring device can be connected to it as needed without impacting the monitored network.

Some taps have multiple output ports, or multiple pairs of output ports for full-duplex, to allow more than one device to monitor the network at the tap point. These are often called regeneration taps.

Some taps operate at the physical layer of the OSI model rather than the data link layer. For example, they work with multi-mode fiber rather than 1000BASE-SX. This means that they can work with most data link network technologies that use that physical media, such as ATM and some forms of Ethernet. Network taps that act as simple optical splitters, sometimes called passive taps (although that term is not used consistently) can have this property.

Some network taps offer both duplication of network traffic for monitoring devices and SNMP services. Most major network tap manufacturers offer taps with remote management through Telnet, HTTP, or SNMP interfaces. Such network tap hybrids can be helpful to network managers who wish to view baseline performance statistics without diverting existing tools. Alternatively, SNMP alarms generated by managed taps can alert network managers to link conditions that merit examination by analyzers to intrusion detection systems.

Some taps get some of their power (i.e., for the pass-through) or all of their power (i.e., for both pass-through and monitor) from the network itself. These can be referred to as having inline power.

Some taps can also reproduce low-level network errors, such as short frames, bad CRC or corrupted data.

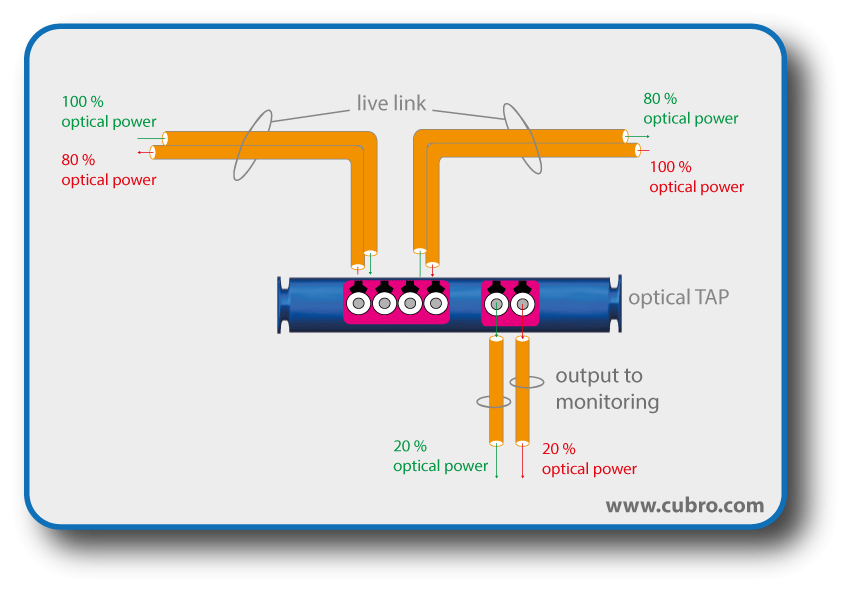
Basic functionality of an optical network tap

=== Advantages of a network tap ===
Here are some advantages of a network tap over port mirroring or SPAN:

- Passive; fail-safe
- Zero configuration
- Secure
- Exact duplicate of network traffic
- No added latency or altered timing
- Passes network errors in addition to good frames/packets
- Oversubscription not an issue

=== Disadvantages and problems ===
Because network taps require additional hardware, they are not as cheap as technologies that use capabilities that are built into the network. However, network taps are easier to manage and normally provide more data than some network devices.

Network taps can require channel bonding on monitoring devices to get around the problem with full-duplex discussed above. Vendors usually refer to this as aggregation as well.

Putting a network tap into place will disrupt the network being monitored for a short time. Even so, a short disruption is preferable to taking a network down multiple times to deploy a monitoring tool. Establishing good guidelines for the placement of network taps is recommended.

Monitoring large networks using network taps can require a lot of monitoring devices. High-end networking devices often allow ports to be enabled as mirror ports, which is a software network tap. While any free port can be configured as a mirror port, software taps require configuration and place a load on the network devices.

Even fully passive network taps introduce new points of failure into the network. There are several ways that taps can cause problems, and this should be considered when creating a tap architecture. Consider non-powered taps for optical-only environments or throwing star network tap for copper 100BASE-TX. This allows you to modify the intelligent aggregation taps that may be in use and avoids any complications when upgrading from 100 megabit to gigabit to 10 gigabit. Redundant power supplies are highly recommended.

Fully passive is only possible on optical connections of any bandwidth and on copper connections from type G703 (2 Mbit/s), 10BASE-T and 100BASE-TX. Passive tapping is currently not possible on 1000BASE-T and 10GBASE-T connections.

== Countermeasures ==
Countermeasures for network taps include encryption and alarm systems. Encryption can make the stolen data unintelligible to the thief. However, encryption can be an expensive solution, and there are also concerns about network bandwidth when it is used.

Another countermeasure is to deploy a fiber-optic sensor into the existing raceway, conduit or armored cable. In this scenario, anyone attempting to physically access the data (copper or fiber infrastructure) is detected by the alarm system. A small number of alarm system manufacturers provide a simple way to monitor the optical fiber for physical intrusion disturbances. There is also a proven solution that utilizes existing dark (unused) fiber in a multi-strand cable for the purpose of creating an alarm system.

In the alarmed cable scenario, the sensing mechanism uses optical interferometry in which modally dispersive coherent light traveling through the multi-mode fiber mixes at the fiber's terminus, resulting in a characteristic pattern of light and dark splotches called speckle. The laser speckle is stable as long as the fiber remains immobile, but flickers when the fiber is vibrated. A fiber-optic sensor works by measuring the time dependence of this speckle pattern and applying digital signal processing to the fast Fourier transform (FFT) of the temporal data.

The U.S. government has been concerned about the tapping threat for many years, and it also has a concern about other forms of intentional or accidental physical intrusion. In the context of classified information Department of Defense (DOD) networks, Protected Distribution Systems (PDS) is a set of military instructions and guidelines for network physical protection. PDS is defined for a system of carriers (raceways, conduits, ducts, etc.) that are used to distribute Military and National Security Information (NSI) between two or more controlled areas or from a controlled area through an area of lesser classification (i.e., outside the SCIF or other similar area). National Security Telecommunications and Information Systems Security Instruction (NSTISSI) No. 7003, Protective Distribution Systems (PDS), provides guidance for the protection of SIPRNET wire line and optical fiber PDS to transmit unencrypted classified National Security Information (NSI).

== Gigabit Ethernet issues ==
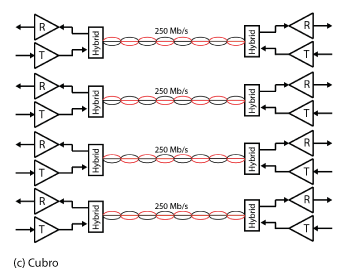
Physical connections for a 1000BASE-T Gigabit Ethernet link

In 1000BASE-T each cable pair transports data simultaneously in both directions. The PHY chips at each end of the cable must separate the two signals from each other. This is only possible because they know their own signal, so they can subtract their own send signals from the mixed signals on the line and then interpret the information sent by their link partners.

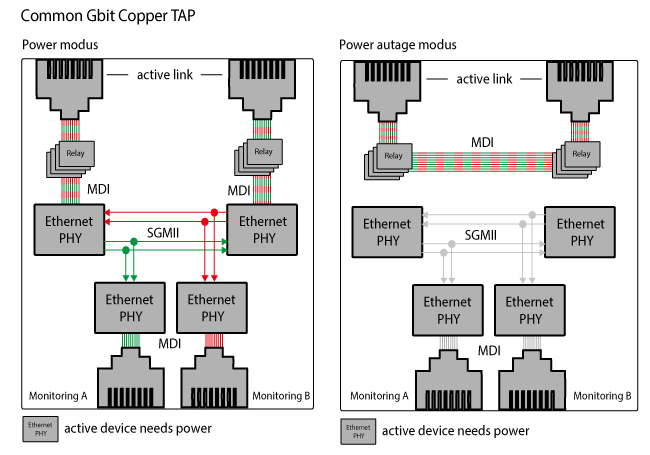
Schematic function of a Gbit Copper TAP

It is not possible to just tap the middle of the wire because all you will see is a complex modulation of two signals. As illustrated above, the way to tap the signal is to use a PHY chip to separate the signal and then send the signal on to the link partner. This solution works but causes some other problems.

1. It is not passive any longer, so in the case of a failure, the link can go down and the services on the link are interrupted. To minimize this problem, each copper tap has a bypass switch (relays), which closes in a power-down situation (as shown in the picture), to bring the link back up. Also, this solution will not detect that the link is down for a minimum of three seconds. These three seconds are a result of the autonegotiation behavior. This can not be changed because it is a vital function of the IEEE 802.3 standard as described in clauses 28 and 40. Even this short interruption time could cause big problems in a network.
  - In some cases, these links cannot be re-established without shutting down the services.
  - Rerouting functions in the network may take place
  - Streaming applications can collapse and cause more issues.
2. Some layer 1 information is not transported over a copper tap (e.g., pause frames)
3. The clock synchronization is affected. Sync-E over a standard Gbit copper tap is impossible and IEEE 1588 is affected, because of the additional delay a copper tap produces.

== See also ==
- Virtual TAP device
- DShield
- ShieldsUP
