= Network forensics =

Sub-branch of digital forensics

Network forensics is a sub-branch of digital forensics relating to the monitoring and analysis of computer network traffic for the purposes of information gathering, legal evidence, or intrusion detection. Unlike other areas of digital forensics, network forensics deals with volatile and dynamic information. Network traffic is transmitted and then lost, so network forensics is often a pro-active investigation.

Network forensics generally has two purposes. The first, relating to security, involves monitoring a network for anomalous traffic and identifying intrusions. An attacker might be able to erase all log files on a compromised host; network-based evidence might therefore be the only evidence available for forensic analysis. The second form relates to law enforcement. In this case analysis of captured network traffic can include tasks such as reassembling transferred files, searching for keywords and parsing human communication such as emails or chat sessions.

Two systems are commonly used to collect network data; a brute force "catch it as you can" and a more intelligent "stop look listen" method.

== Overview ==
Network forensics is a comparatively new field of forensic science. The growing popularity of the Internet in homes means that computing has become network-centric and data is now available outside of disk-based digital evidence. Network forensics can be performed as a standalone investigation or alongside a computer forensics analysis (where it is often used to reveal links between digital devices or reconstruct how a crime was committed).

Marcus Ranum is credited with defining Network forensics as "the capture, recording, and analysis of network events in order to discover the source of security attacks or other problem incidents".

Compared to computer forensics, where evidence is usually preserved on disk, network data is more volatile and unpredictable. Investigators often only have material to examine if packet filters, firewalls, and intrusion detection systems were set up to anticipate breaches of security.

Systems used to collect network data for forensic analysis generally fall into two categories:

- "Catch-it-as-you-can" – In this approach, each packet is analysed in memory, and only selected information is saved for subsequent examination. This approach requires large amounts of storage.
- "Stop, look and listen" – This is where each packet is analyzed in a rudimentary way in memory and only certain information saved for future analysis. This approach requires a faster processor to keep up with incoming traffic.

== Types ==
=== Ethernet ===
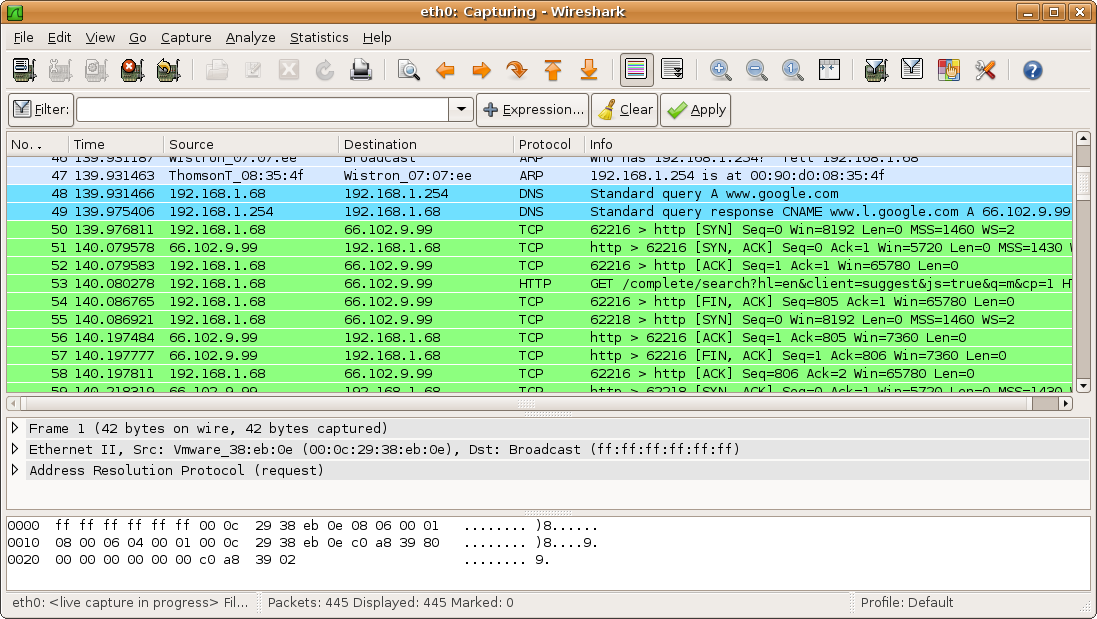
Wireshark, a common tool used to monitor and record network traffic

Packet analyzers such as Wireshark allow captured traffic to be filtered by protocol and by the values of individual packet fields. With these tools, website pages, email attachments, and other network traffic can be reconstructed only if they are transmitted or received unencrypted. An advantage of collecting this data is that it is directly connected to a host. If, for example the IP address or the MAC address of a host at a certain time is known, all data sent to or from this IP or MAC address can be filtered.

To establish the connection between IP and MAC address, it is useful to take a closer look at auxiliary network protocols. The Address Resolution Protocol (ARP) tables list the MAC addresses with the corresponding IP addresses.

To collect data on this layer, the network interface card (NIC) of a host can be put into "promiscuous mode". In so doing, all traffic will be passed to the CPU, not only the traffic meant for the host.

However, if an intruder or attacker is aware that his connection might be eavesdropped, he might use encryption to secure his connection. It is almost impossible nowadays to break encryption but the fact that a suspect's connection to another host is encrypted all the time might indicate that the other host is an accomplice of the suspect.

=== TCP/IP ===
On the network layer the Internet Protocol (IP) is responsible for directing the packets generated by TCP through the network (e.g., the Internet) by adding source and destination information which can be interpreted by routers all over the network. Cellular digital packet networks, like GPRS, use similar protocols like IP, so the methods described for IP work with them as well.

For the correct routing, every intermediate router must have a routing table to know where to send the packet next. These routing tables are one of the best sources of information if investigating a digital crime and trying to track down an attacker. To do this, it is necessary to follow the packets of the attacker, reverse the sending route and find the computer the packet came from (i.e., the attacker).

=== Encrypted traffic analytics ===
Given the proliferation of TLS encryption on the internet, as of April 2021 it is estimated that half of all malware uses TLS to evade detection. When traffic is encrypted, devices monitoring it in transit can generally observe only basic attributes, such as the source and destination IP addresses; examining the content requires a collection point where the traffic has already been decrypted, for example a sensor placed directly behind a VPN gateway. Encrypted traffic analysis inspects traffic to identify encrypted traffic coming from malware and other threats by detecting suspicious combinations of TLS characteristics, usually to uncommon networks or servers. Another approach to encrypted traffic analysis uses a generated database of fingerprints, although these techniques have been criticized as being easily bypassed by hackers and inaccurate.

=== Internet ===
The internet can be a rich source of digital evidence including web browsing, email, newsgroup, synchronous chat and peer-to-peer traffic. For example, web server logs can be used to show when (or if) a suspect accessed information related to criminal activity. Email accounts can contain useful evidence; but email headers can be forged. Network forensic analysis may help establish the origin relevant communications. Network forensics can also be used in order to find out who is using a particular computer by extracting user account information from the network traffic.

== Wireless forensics ==
Wireless forensics is a sub-discipline of network forensics. The main goal of wireless forensics is to provide the methodology and tools required to collect and analyze (wireless) network traffic that can be presented as valid digital evidence in a court of law. The evidence collected can correspond to plain data or, with the broad usage of Voice-over-IP (VoIP) technologies, especially over wireless, can include voice conversations.

Analysis of wireless network traffic is similar to that of wired networks, but may require additional consideration of wireless security measures.

== See also ==
- Deep packet inspection
