= Tcpdump =

Data-network packet analyzer

tcpdump

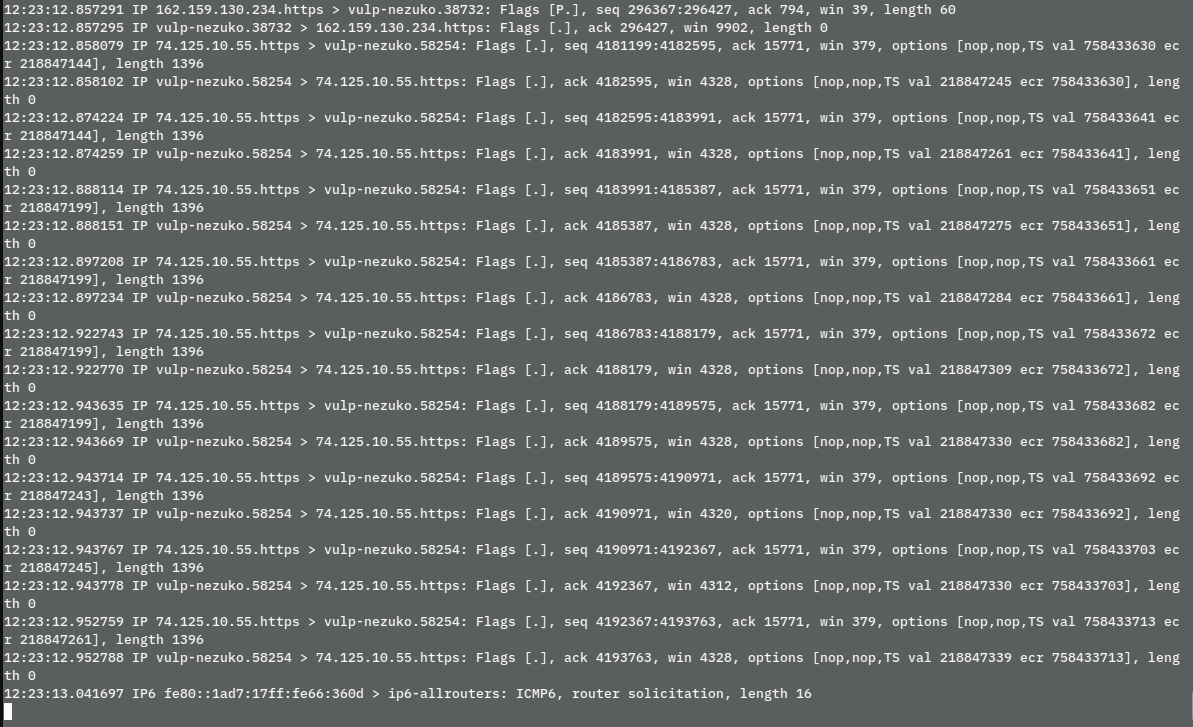
- tcpdump console output
- Developer: The Tcpdump team
- Release: 1988
- Stable release: 4.99.6 / 30 December 2025; 7 months ago
- Written in: C
- Operating system: Linux (including Android and embedded distribution such as OpenWrt), Solaris, FreeBSD, NetBSD, OpenBSD, DragonFly BSD, macOS, and additional *NIX systems, Windows, AmigaOS 4
- Type: Packet analyzer
- License: BSD license
- Website: www.tcpdump.org
- Repository: tcpdump on GitHub

tcpdump is a data-network packet analyzer computer program that runs under a command line interface. It allows the user to display TCP/IP and other packets being transmitted or received over a network to which the computer is attached. Distributed under the BSD license, tcpdump is free software.

Tcpdump works on most Unix-like operating systems: Linux (including Android and embedded distribution such as OpenWrt), Solaris, FreeBSD, DragonFly BSD, NetBSD, OpenBSD, macOS, HP-UX 11i, and AIX. In those systems, tcpdump uses the libpcap library to capture packets. The port of tcpdump for Windows is called WinDump; it uses WinPcap, the Windows version of libpcap.

== History ==
tcpdump was originally written in 1988 by Van Jacobson, Sally Floyd, Vern Paxson and Steven McCanne who were, at the time, working in the Lawrence Berkeley Laboratory Network Research Group. By the late 1990s there were numerous versions of tcpdump distributed as part of various operating systems, and numerous patches that were not well coordinated. Michael Richardson (mcr) and Bill Fenner created www.tcpdump.org in 1999.

== Common uses ==
tcpdump prints the contents of network packets. It can read packets from a network interface card or from a previously created saved packet file. tcpdump can write packets to standard output or a file.

It is also possible to use tcpdump for the specific purpose of intercepting and displaying the communications of another user or computer. A user with the necessary privileges on a system acting as a router or gateway through which unencrypted traffic such as Telnet or HTTP passes can use tcpdump to view login IDs, passwords, the URLs and content of websites being viewed, or any other unencrypted information.

The user may optionally apply a BPF-based filter to limit the number of packets seen by tcpdump; this renders the output more usable on networks with a high volume of traffic.

Example of available capture interfaces on a Linux system:

$ tcpdump -D
1.eth0 [Up, Running, Connected]
2.any (Pseudo-device that captures on all interfaces) [Up, Running]
3.lo [Up, Running, Loopback]
4.bluetooth-monitor (Bluetooth Linux Monitor) [Wireless]
5.usbmon2 (Raw USB traffic, bus number 2)
6.usbmon1 (Raw USB traffic, bus number 1)
7.usbmon0 (Raw USB traffic, all USB buses) [none]
8.nflog (Linux netfilter log (NFLOG) interface) [none]
9.nfqueue (Linux netfilter queue (NFQUEUE) interface) [none]
10.dbus-system (D-Bus system bus) [none]
11.dbus-session (D-Bus session bus) [none]
12.bluetooth0 (Bluetooth adapter number 0)
13.eth1 [none, Disconnected]

== Privileges required ==
In some Unix-like operating systems, a user must have superuser privileges to use tcpdump because the packet capturing mechanisms on those systems require elevated privileges. However, the -Z option may be used to drop privileges to a specific unprivileged user after capturing has been set up. In other Unix-like operating systems, the packet capturing mechanism can be configured to allow non-privileged users to use it; if that is done, superuser privileges are not required.

== See also ==
- Tcptrace, a tool for analyzing the logs produced by tcpdump
- EtherApe, a network mapping tool that relies on sniffing traffic
- Ngrep, a tool that can match regular expressions within the network packet payloads
- netsniff-ng, a free Linux networking toolkit
- Wireshark, a GUI based alternative to tcpdump
