= WiGLE =

Worldwide hotspot information collection website

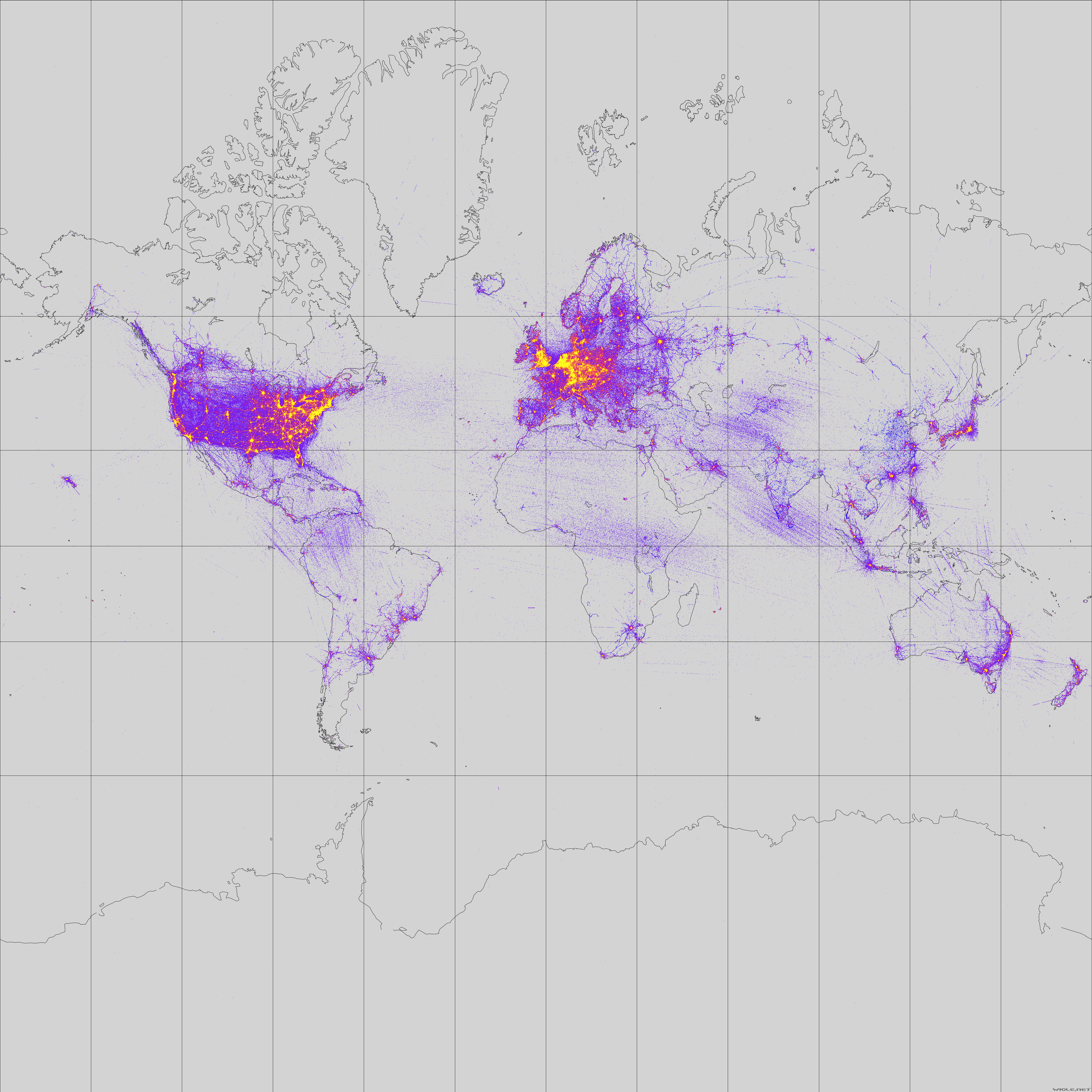
- A map of Wi-Fi nodes in the world collected by the WiGLE project, 2019
- Website type: Wireless hotspot data collection and mapping
- Owner: WiGLE
- Website: https://wigle.net
- Commercial: Yes
- Registration: Required for data uploads and access
- Launched: September 2001
- Current status: Active

WiGLE (Wireless Geographic Logging Engine) is a website for collecting information about the different wireless hotspots around the world. Users can register on the website and upload hotspot data like GPS coordinates, SSID, MAC address and the encryption type used on the hotspots discovered. In addition, cell tower data is uploaded and displayed.

By obtaining information about the encryption of the different hotspots, WiGLE tries to create an awareness of the need for security by running a wireless network.

The first recorded hotspot on WiGLE was uploaded in September 2001. By June 2017, WiGLE counted over 349 million recorded WiFi networks in its database, whereof 345 million was recorded with GPS coordinates and over 4.8 billion unique recorded observations. In addition, the database now contains 7.80 million unique cell towers including 7.75 million with GPS coordinates. By May 2019, WiGLE had a total of 551 million networks recorded.

== Mentions in books ==
From Hacking for Dummies to Introduction to Neogeography, WiGLE is a well known resource and tool. As early as 2004, its database of 228,000 wireless networks was being used to advocate better security of Wifi. Several books mentioned the WiGLE database in 2005, including internationally, and the association with vehicles was also becoming widely known. Some associations of WiGLE have been positive, and some have been darker. By 2004, the site was sufficiently well known that the announcement of a new book quoted the co-founder, saying “This is the ‘Kama Sutra’ of wardriving literature. If you can't wardrive after reading this, nature has selected you not to. This is the first complete guide on the subject we’ve ever seen (it mentions us). Don't quote me on that.” –Bob “bobzilla” Hagemann, WiGLE.net CoFounder" and a shortened quote appeared on the book's cover.

== Mentions in academic papers ==
In early days, circa 2003 the lack of mapping was criticized, and was said to force WiFi seekers to use more primitive methods. "The most primitive method disseminated is warchalking, where mappers inscribe a symbolic markup on the physical premises to indicate the presence of a wireless network in the area." Regarding WiGLE in particular, it was said, "The Netstumbler map site and the Wireless Geographic Logging Engine store more detailed wardrive trace data, yet do not offer any visualization format that is particularly useful or informative." By 2004 others felt differently, however, and a WiFi news site said about "the fine folks at wigle.net who have 900,000 access points in their wardriving database," "While the maps aren't as pretty, they're quite good, and the URLs correspond to specific locations where WiFiMaps hides the URL-to-location mapping." In late 2004, other authors stated, "that war driving is now ubiquitous: a good illustration of this is provided by the WiGLE.net online database of WAPS." They also said, "The motherload of WAP maps is available on the Wireless Geographic Logging Engine Web site (wigle.net). Circa late September 2004, WiGLE’s database and mapping technology included over 1.6 million WAPS. If you can’t find the WAP of interest there, you can probably live without it." In 2005, using WiFi databases for geolocation was being discussed, and WiGLE, with approximately 2.4 million located access points in the database, was often mentioned. In 2017, data from WiGLE was used as a source for WiFi router locations and encryption frequencies. In 2018, data from the WiGLE database was compared against the data collected by the authors. The WiGLE Android app was compared against other wardriving tools in a conference in 2021. In 2024, data from the WiGLE database was compared against Apple's location services and Erik Rye and Dave Levin found that the vast majority of networks in their sample from the WiGLE database were within 1 km of the Apple database.

== Licensing ==
Although the apps used to collect information are open sourced, the database itself is accessed and distributed under a freeware proprietary license. Commercial use of parts of the data may be bought. The Android app to collect Wi-Fi hotspots and their geographic correspondent information is available under a 3-clause BSD license.

== See also ==
- Cell ID
- Geolocation software
- KisMAC
- Kismet
- Location as a service
- Mozilla Location Service
- Navizon
- NetStumbler
- Skyhook Wireless
- Wardriving
- Wi-Fi positioning system
