= Outline of computing =

Overview of and topical guide to computing

The following outline is provided as an overview of and topical guide to computing:

Computing – activity of using and improving computer hardware and computer software.

== Branches of computing ==
- Computer science (see also Outline of computer science)
- Information technology – refers to the application (esp in businesses and other organisations) of computer science, that is, its use by mankind (see also Outline of information technology)
- Information systems – refers to the study of the application of IT to business processes
- Computer engineering (see also Outline of computer engineering)
- Software engineering (see also Outline of software engineering)

== Computer science ==
Computer science – (outline)

- Computer science
- Theory of computation
- Scientific computing
- Metacomputing
- Autonomic computing

== Computers ==
See information processor for a high-level block diagram.

- Computer
- Computer hardware
- History of computing hardware
- Processor design
- Computer network
- Computer performance by orders of magnitude

=== Instruction-level taxonomies ===
After the commoditization of memory, attention turned to optimizing CPU performance at the instruction level. Various methods of speeding up the fetch-execute cycle include:

- designing instruction set architectures with simpler, faster instructions: RISC as opposed to CISC
- Superscalar instruction execution
- VLIW architectures, which make parallelism explicit

== Software ==
- Software engineering
- Computer programming
- Computational
- Software patent
- Firmware
- System software
  - Device drivers
  - Operating systems
  - Utilities
- Application Software
  - Databases
  - Geographic information system
  - Spreadsheet
  - Word processor
- Programming languages
  - Interpreters
  - Compilers
  - Assemblers
- Speech recognition
- Speech synthesis

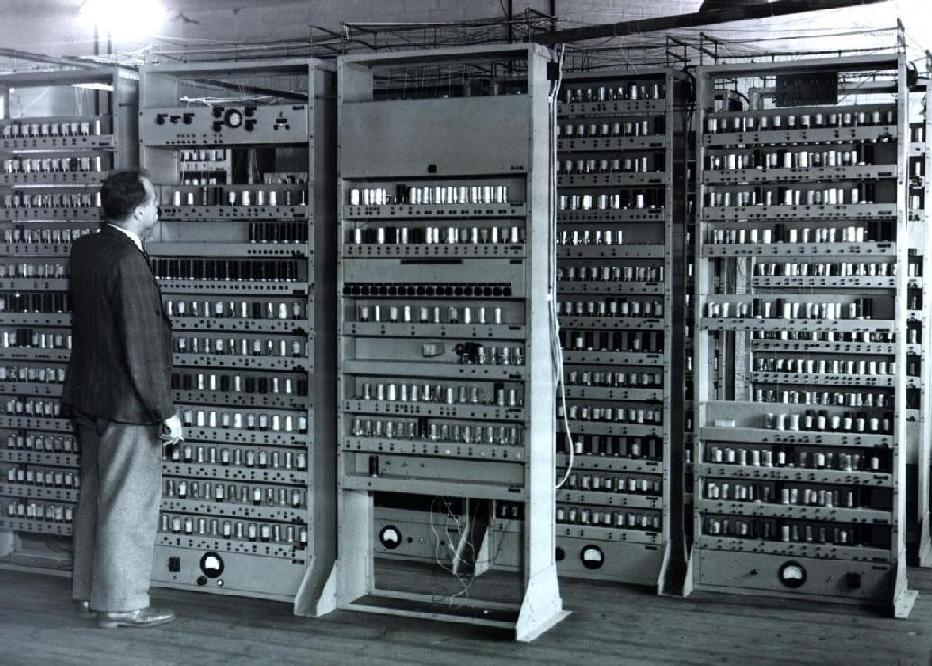
Part of an early computer, EDSAC.

== History of computing ==
- History of computing
  - History of computing hardware from the tally stick to the quantum computer
  - History of computer science
  - History of computer animation
  - History of computer graphics
  - History of computer networking
  - History of computer vision
  - Punched card
  - Unit record equipment
  - IBM 700/7000 series
  - IBM 1400 series
  - IBM System/360
  - History of IBM magnetic disk drives

== Business computing ==
- Accounting software
- Computer-aided design
- Computer-aided manufacturing
- Computer-aided dispatch
- Customer relationship management
- Data warehouse
- Decision support system
- Electronic data processing
- Enterprise resource planning
- Geographic information system
- Hospital information system
- Human resource management system
- Management information system
- Material requirements planning
- Product Lifecycle Management
- Strategic enterprise management
- Supply chain management
- Utility Computing

== Human factors ==
- Accessible computing
- Computer-induced medical problems
- Computer user satisfaction
- Human-computer interaction (outline)
- Human-centered computing

== Computer network ==
=== Wired and wireless computer network ===
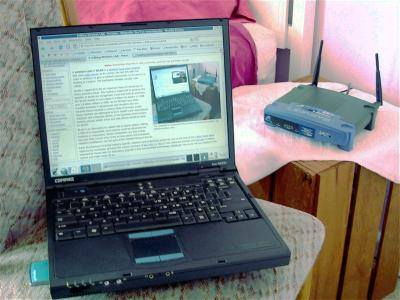
This notebook computer is connected to a wireless access point using a PC card wireless card.

- Types
  - Wide area network
  - Metropolitan area network
  - City Area Network
  - Village Area Network
  - Local area network
    - Wireless local area network
- Mesh networking
- Collaborative workspace
- Internet
- Network management

=== Computing technology based wireless networking (CbWN) ===
The main goal of CbWN is to optimize the system performance of the flexible wireless network.

- Source coding
  - Codebook design for side information based transmission techniques such as Precoding
  - Wyner-Ziv coding for cooperative wireless communications
- Security
  - Dirty paper coding for cooperative multiple antenna or user precoding
- Intelligence
  - Game theory for wireless networking
  - Cognitive communications
  - Flexible sectorization, Beamforming and SDMA
- Software
  - Software defined radio (SDR)
  - Programmable air-interface
  - Downloadable algorithm: e.g., downloadable codebook for Precoding

== Computer security ==
- Cryptology – cryptography – information theory
- Cracking – demon dialing – Hacking – war dialing – war driving
- Social engineering – Dumpster diving
- Physical security – Black bag job
- Computer security
- Computer surveillance
- Defensive programming
- Malware
- Security engineering

== Data ==
=== Numeric data ===
- Integral data types – bit, byte, etc.
- Real data types:
  - Floating point (Single precision, Double precision, etc.)
  - Fixed point
  - Rational number
- Decimal
  - Binary-coded decimal (BCD)
  - Excess-3 BCD (XS-3)
  - Biquinary-coded decimal
- representation: Binary – Octal – Decimal – Hexadecimal (hex)
- Computer mathematics – Computer numbering formats

=== Character data ===
- storage: Character – String – text
  - representation: ASCII – Unicode – Multibyte – EBCDIC (Widecharacter, Multicharacter) – FIELDATA – Baudot

=== Other data topics ===
- Data compression
- Digital signal processing
- Image processing
- Data management
- Routing
- Data Protection Act

== Classes of computers ==
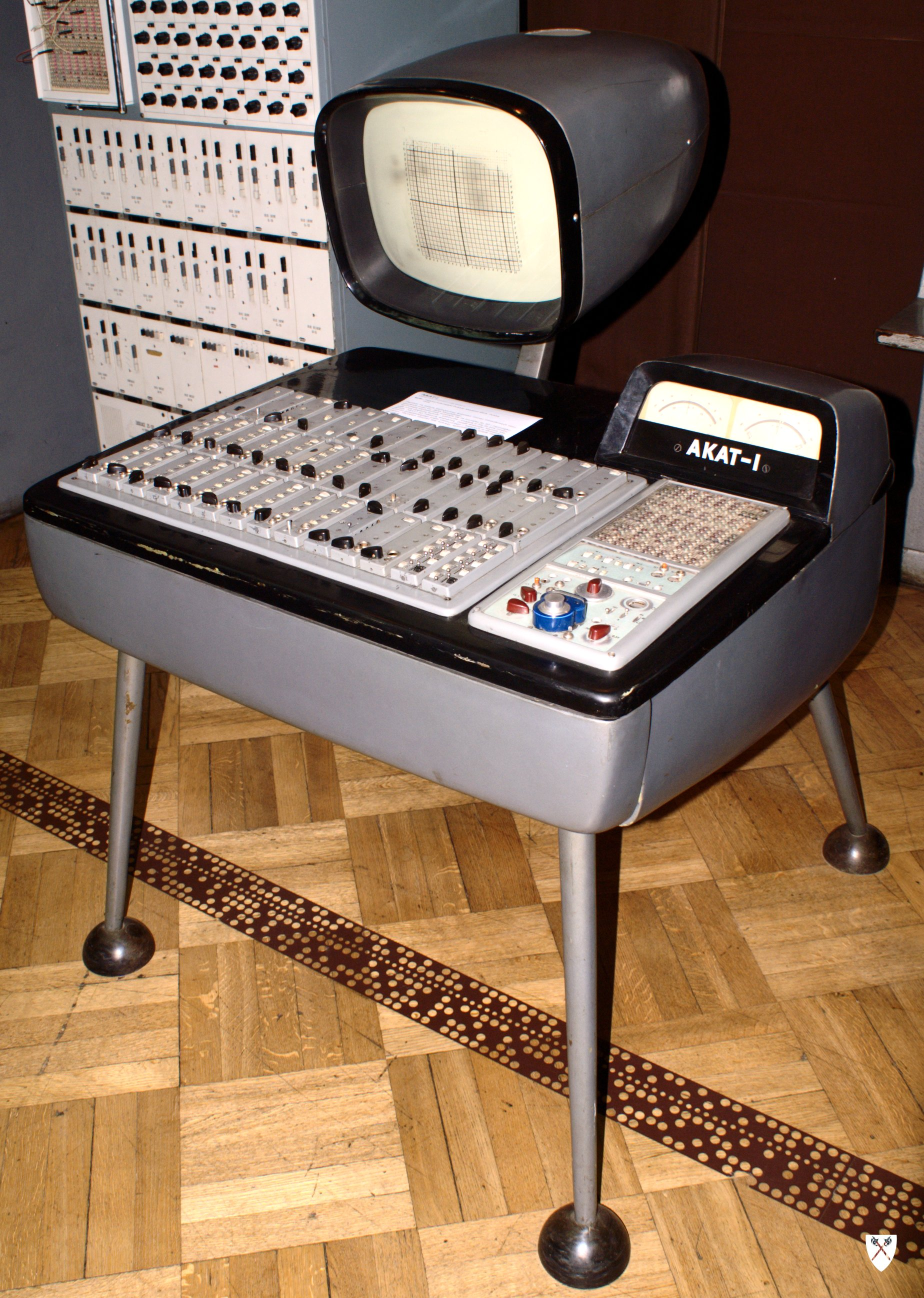
Polish analog computer AKAT-1

There are several terms which describe classes, or categories, of computers:

- Analog computer
- Calculator
- Desktop computer
- Desktop replacement computer
- Digital computer
- Embedded computer
- Home computer
- Laptop
- Mainframe
- Minicomputer
- Microcomputer
- Personal computer
- Portable computer
- Personal digital assistant (aka PDA, or Handheld computer)
- Programmable logic controller or PLC
- Server
- Smartphone
- Supercomputer
- Tablet computer
- Video game console
- Workstation

== Organizations ==
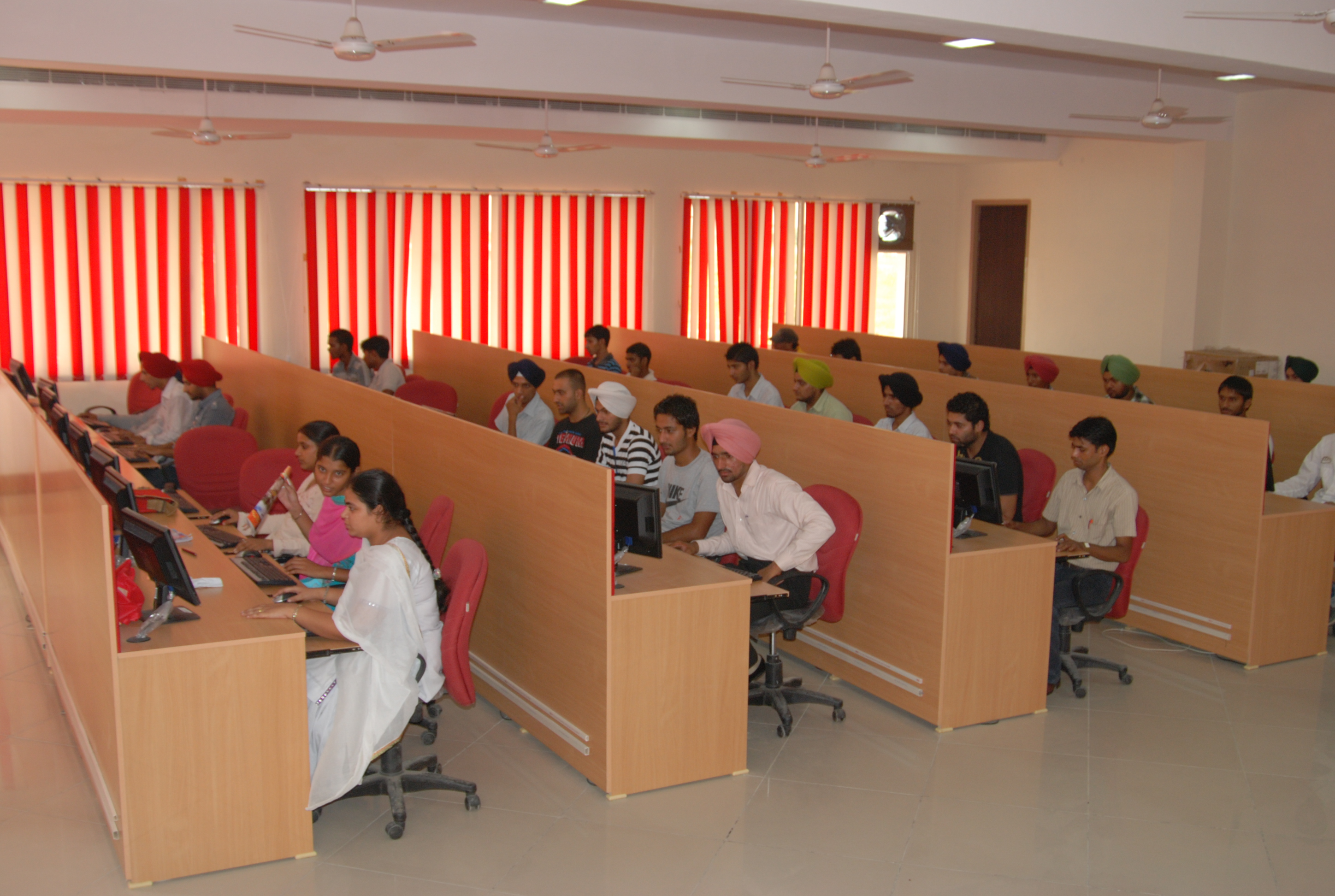
A computer Lab

=== Companies – current ===
- Apple
- Asus
- Avaya
- Dell
- Fujitsu
- Gateway Computers
- Groupe Bull
- HCL
- Hewlett-Packard
- Hitachi, Ltd.
- Intel Corporation
- IBM
- Lenovo
- Microsoft
- NEC Corporation
- Novell
- Panasonic
- Red Hat
- Silicon Graphics
- Sun Microsystems
- Unisys

=== Companies – historic ===
- Acorn, bought by Olivetti
- Amdahl Corporation, bought by Fujitsu
- Bendix Corporation
- Burroughs Corporation, merged with Sperry to become Unisys
- Compaq, bought by Hewlett-Packard
- Control Data
- Cray
- Data General
- Digital Equipment Corporation, bought by Compaq, later bought by Hewlett-Packard
- Digital Research – produced system software for early Intel microprocessor-based computers
- Elliott Brothers
- English Electric Company
- Ferranti
- General Electric, computer division bought by Honeywell, then Bull
- Honeywell, computer division bought by Bull
- ICL
- Leo
- Lisp Machines, Inc.
- Marconi
- Micro Instrumentation and Telemetry Systems produced the first widely sold microcomputer system (kit and assembled)
- Nixdorf Computer, bought by Siemens
- Norsk Data
- Olivetti
- Osborne
- Packard Bell
- PERQ
- Prime Computer
- Raytheon
- Royal McBee
- RCA
- Scientific Data Systems, sold to Xerox
- Siemens
- Sinclair Research, created the ZX Spectrum, ZX80, and ZX81
- Southweat Technical products Corporation produced microcomputers systems (kit and assembled), peripherals, and software based on Motorola 6800 and 6809 microcomputer chips
- Sperry, which bought UNIVAC, and later merged with Burroughs to become Unisys
- Symbolics
- UNIVAC
- Varian Data Machines, a division of Varian Associates which was bought by Sperry
- Wang

=== Professional organizations ===
- Association for Computing Machinery (ACM)
- Association for Survey Computing (ASC)
- British Computer Society (BCS)
- Canadian Information Processing Society (CIPS)
- Computer Measurement Group (CMG)
- Institute of Electrical and Electronics Engineers (IEEE), in particular the IEEE Computer Society
- Institution of Electrical Engineers
- International Electrotechnical Commission (IEC)

=== Standards bodies ===
- International Electrotechnical Commission (IEC)
- International Organization for Standardization (ISO)
- Institute of Electrical and Electronics Engineers (IEEE)
- Internet Engineering Task Force (IETF)
- World Wide Web Consortium (W3C)

=== Open standards bodies ===
See also Open standard

- Apdex Alliance – Application Performance Index
- Application Response Measurement (ARM)

== Computing publications ==
- Digital Bibliography & Library Project – as of July 2007, lists over 910,000 bibliographic entries on computer science and several thousand links to the home pages of computer scientists.

== Persons influential in computing ==
Major figures associated with making personal computers popular.

- Microsoft
  - Bill Gates
  - Paul Allen
- Apple Inc.
  - Steve Jobs
  - Steve Wozniak
