= GSM Cell ID =

Identifier of a base station on a cell phone network

A GSM Cell ID (CID) is generally a unique number used to identify each base transceiver station (BTS) or sector of a BTS within a location area code (LAC) if not within a GSM network.

In some cases the first or last digit of CID represents cells' Sector ID:

- value 0 is used for omnidirectional antenna,
- values 1, 2, and 3 are used to identify sectors of bisector or trisector antennas.

In UMTS, there is a distinction between Cell ID (CID) and UTRAN Cell ID (also called LCID). The UTRAN Cell ID (LCID) is a concatenation of the RNC-ID (12 bits, ID of the Radio Network Controller) and Cell ID (16 bits, unique ID of the Cell). CID is just the Cell ID. The concatenation of both will still be unique but can be confusing in some cellid databases as some store the CID and other store LCID. It makes sense to record them separately as the RNC ID is the same for many cells, the unique element is the CID.

A valid CID ranges from 0 to 65535 (2^{16} − 1) on GSM and CDMA networks and from 0 to 268,435,455 (2^{28} − 1) on UMTS and LTE networks.

== Cell ID databases and services ==
A number of commercial and public Cell ID databases and services are available:

Name	Unique cells	Countries (MCC)	Operators (MNC)	Measurements	Free database download	Active project	Data license	Comment
Cell Spotting	0.1 million		667			no	CC0	
Combain Mobile	>185 million	>240	>1700	>150 billion	no	yes		Supports GSM, CDMA, UMTS, LTE, NB-IoT and NR via API.
LocationAPI.org	157.89 million	240	1712	25 billion	no	yes		Supports WiFi, GSM, CDMA, UMTS and LTE technologies via its API. Unwired Labs LocationAPI Global Coverage Map
Mozilla Location Service	28.2 million	240		2.7 billion	yes	no	CC0	Based on crowd-sourced data. Also WiFi database. Cooperating with OpenCelliD and Combain.
Mylnikov GEO	>34 million	505	3500		yes	no		Contains data from radiocells.org, OpenCellID and MLS.
Navizon	71 million	239	1712	22 billion	no	yes		Based on crowd-sourced data. Also WiFi database.
NetMeterProject.com	0.2 million	77	174	10 million	limited; private use only	no		Only a small portion of the database can be downloaded and for private use only: the measurements where the crowd users accepted the "Creative Commons Namensnennung-Nicht-kommerziell-Weitergabe unter gleichen Bedingungen 3.0 Deutschland" license
OpenCellID by Unwired Labs	38.9 million	222	753	2.1 billion	yes	yes	CC-BY-SA 3.0	OpenCellID database growth monthly Based on crowd-sourced data; free API key required for database download; Service is now maintained by Unwired Labs.
OpenSignal	0.8 million		825	5.2 billion	no	yes		
radiocells.org	0.7 million	94	243		yes	no	CC-BY-SA 3.0	Based on crowd-sourced data.
WiGLE	6.2 million				no	yes		
CellMapper					no	yes		
OpenMobileNetwork								
G-NetWold by Gyokov Solutions								
Skyhook Wireless								
Google Location Services								
Apple Location Services								
Microsoft Location Services								

== See also ==
- Base transceiver station
- Field test mode
- E-CellID
