= E cell =

E cell may refer to:

- Electrochemical cell, a device that either generates electrical energy
- Standard electrode potential, sometimes designated as $E^\ominus_{cell}$
- Mercedes-Benz A-Class E-CELL, a 2010 car model
- Mercedes-Benz Vito E-CELL, a 2010-2012 car model
- The Entrepreneurship Cell, IIT Bombay (E-Cell, IIT Bombay), the primary entrepreneurship promoting body of the Indian Institute of Technology Bombay
- E-CellID, a positioning feature introduced in rel9 E-UTRA (LTE radio)
