= E-CellID =

Enhanced Cell ID, E-CellID, or E-CID is a positioning feature introduced in rel9 E-UTRA (LTE radio). The UE reports to the network (ESMLC) the serving cell ID, the timing advance (difference between its transmit and receive time) and the IDs, estimated timing and power of the detected neighbor cells. The enodeB may report extra information to the ESMLC like the angle of arrival. The ESMLC estimates the UE position based on this information and its knowledge of the cells positions.

Cell ID based methods were already possible before rel9. Enhanced cell ID aggregates together some already available measurements, some of them with increased accuracy requirements to improve the positioning accuracy capabilities.

== Technology ==
Similarly to an OTDOA procedure, a E-CID procedure is initiated through the LPP protocol by the ESMLC, with a ECID-RequestLocationInformation request message.

The UE performs and collects the necessary measurements, and reports them back using the ECID-ProvideLocationInformation. This message contains a list with the following details, depending on the UE capability, for each cell it detected:

- The Cell ID of the cell.
- RSRP (reference signals received power) measurement: A measurement of the received power level.
- RSRQ (reference signals received quality) measurement: A measurement of the received quality (SNR).
- Rx-Tx time difference (only for the serving cell): An estimation of the time difference between its reception and transmission time at the UE antenna, that is the time difference between the start of a DL subframe and the transmission of the corresponding UL subframe.

From these the ESMLC estimates the UE position.

The RSRP, RSRQ and Rx-Tx time difference measurements are defined in the 36.214 specification, and their accuracy requirements are specified in the 36.133 specification.
