= GadgetTrak =

- Developer: GadgetTrak Inc.
- Release: February 24, 2007
- Written in: Objective-C, C++, Java, .NET, Linux
- Operating system: Windows, OS X, Android, iOS
- Type: Laptop & mobile tracking software
- License: Commercial

Until 2019, GadgetTrak was a company based in Portland, Oregon, that developed theft recovery and data protection software. The company was founded in February 2007 by Ken Westin with the launch of the first theft recovery product for USB mass storage devices, tracking stolen devices including iPods, flash drives, digital cameras and other devices when connected to a computer. The company was issued a patent for the technology on February 24, 2009. GadgetTrak's technology was featured during a special segment by Dateline on iPod theft where they tracked stolen iPods and confronted the thieves. A customized version of the technology was embedded in FLIR thermal imaging cameras as part of an exclusive licensing agreement under the name ThermaTrak utilized for both theft recovery as well as export controls.

== Mobile software ==
In October 2008, the company launched its GadgetTrak Mobile Security app for Blackberry and Windows mobile devices.

On November 4, 2008, the company launched its first mobile security software app for iOS devices.

At CES 2012, the company launched a version of GadgetTrak Mobile Security for Android devices. Along with the Android release, other upgrades were added, including a web-based control panel to activate tracking, remotely wipe data from the device, encrypt and backup data as well as an enterprise group management console.

Just after launch, the application was put to test by a chain of Sprint stores that installed the software on their demo units. One store in Tigard, Oregon had several devices stolen. Fortunately, they were able to recover the devices and apprehend the thieves using their Mobile Security app.

== Laptop software ==
On November 12, 2008, the company launched the Mac laptop version of its software that utilizes the web camera to capture a photo of a thief, as well as the utilization of Wi-Fi positioning to provide location within 10–20 meters. Shortly after the product launch, several stolen laptop recoveries were using the software, the first being in Brooklyn, New York where a stolen iMac was tracked to a tattoo parlor where police recovered the stolen computer along with other stolen property.

In April 2009, the company launched a Windows version of their laptop software further expanding their product offering.
