= After B. K. S. Iyengar (Engman) =

Abstract bronze sculpture by Robert Engman

Coordinates: 40.085277°N 75.221734°W

After B.K.S. Iyengar
- Artist: Robert Engman
- Year: 1978
- Type: Bronze
- Dimensions: 200 cm × 280 cm × 170 cm (80 in × 110 in × 68 in)
- Location: Philadelphia
- Owner: Marvin and Marian Garfinkel

After B.K.S. Iyengar is an abstract bronze sculpture, by Robert Engman, that commemorates B. K. S. Iyengar's 1976 visit to the United States.

It is located at Morris Arboretum, 9414 Meadowbrook Avenue, English Park Step Garden, Philadelphia. It was dedicated in September 1988.

Another casting is at the Annmarie Sculpture Garden, Solomons, Maryland, on loan from the Hirshhorn Museum and Sculpture Garden.

The statue was originally sited at Cobble Court, the historic house built by J. H. Carstair and owned by Marvin and Marian Garfinkel. Iyengar was a guest of the Garfinkels when he visited Philadelphia in 1976 and gave a public demonstration of yoga at Haverford College. Artist Robert Engman was one of the Garfinkels' neighbors.

== See also ==
- List of public art in Philadelphia
