= Moab (disambiguation) =

Moab is the historical name for an ancient kingdom whose former territory is located in modern-day Jordan.

Moab or MOAB may also refer to:

== Places ==
- Moab, Utah, a United States city
- Newman Lake, Washington, an unincorporated community alternatively known as Moab

== Arts and entertainment ==
- "Moab", a song by Conor Oberst from Conor Oberst
- Moab, a fictional planet in the comic strip The Ballad of Halo Jones
- Massive Ornary Air Blimp, a type of Bloon in the Bloons Tower Defense series

== Science and technology ==
- GBU-43/B MOAB (Massive Ordnance Air Blast), or Mother Of All Bombs
- Moab Cluster Suite, a cluster workload management package
- Monoclonal antibody (MoAb), identical antibodies produced by offspring of a single parent cell
- Novell "Moab", codename for Novell NetWare 5.0
- Month of Apple Bugs (MoAB), a month of bugs computer security strategy

== Other uses ==
- Moab, the first son of Lot and patriarch of the kingdom of Moab, mentioned in the Hebrew Bible
- Mother of all battles

== See also ==
- Moabite (disambiguation)
