= H. D. Moore =

American businessman (born 1981)

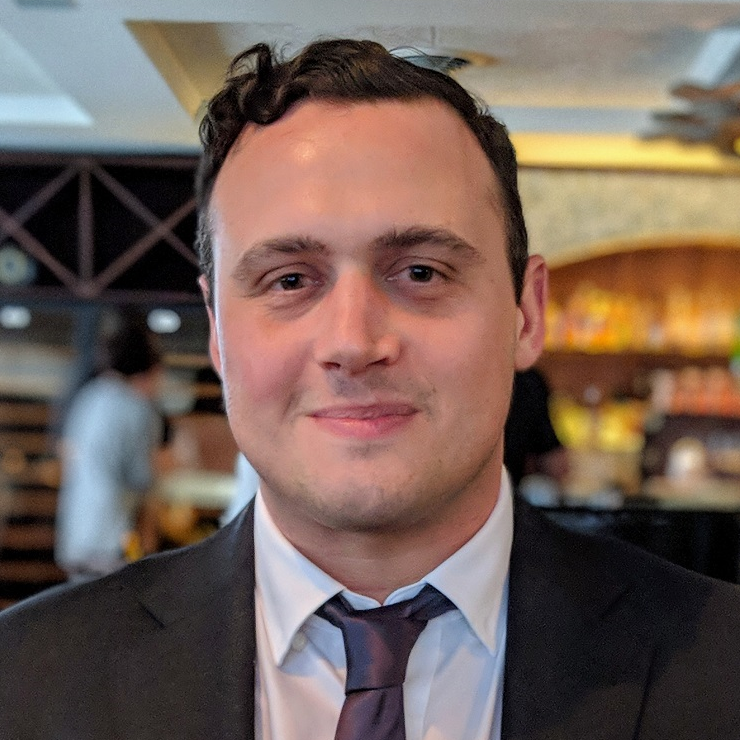
- Born: 1981 (age 44–45)
- Occupations: Information security researcher and programmer
- Known for: Metasploit
- Website: hdm.io

HD Moore is an American network security expert, open source programmer, and hacker. He is the founder of the Metasploit Project and was the main developer of the Metasploit Framework, a penetration testing software suite.

Moore is currently the co-founder and chief technical officer of runZero, Inc, a provider of cyber asset attack surface management software and cloud solutions. The company was originally founded in 2018 as Rumble, Inc and renamed to runZero, Inc. in 2022.

Prior to starting runZero, Moore served as the vice president of research and development at Atredis Partners, the chief research officer at Boston, Massachusetts-based security firm Rapid7, and remained the chief architect of the Metasploit Framework until his departure from Rapid7 in 2016.

== Information security work ==
Moore developed security software utilities for the United States Department of Defense as a teenager, and founded the Metasploit Project in the summer of 2003 with the goal of becoming a public resource for exploit code research and development.

He is known for his work in WarVOX, AxMan, the Metasploit Decloaking Engine and the Rogue Network Link Detection Tools, and started a "Month of Browser Bugs" (MoBB) initiative in 2006 as an experiment in fast-paced vulnerability discovery with full disclosure. This started the Month of Bugs project meme, and resulted a number of web browser patches and improved security measures.

Moore has discovered, or been involved in the discovery of, a number of critical security vulnerabilities.

=== Metasploit Framework ===
The Metasploit Framework is a development platform for creating security tools and exploits. The framework is used by network security professionals to perform penetration testing, system administrators to verify patch installations, product vendors to perform regression testing, and security researchers worldwide. The framework is written in the Ruby programming language and includes components written in C and assembly language. In October 2009, the Metasploit project was acquired by Rapid7. While the Metasploit Framework continues to be free, Rapid7 has added commercial editions. With the acquisition of the project, HD Moore became chief security officer at Rapid7, and later chief research officer, while remaining chief architect of Metasploit.

=== WarVOX ===
WarVOX is a software suite for exploring, classifying, and auditing telephone systems. Unlike normal wardialing tools, WarVOX processes the raw audio from each call and does not use a modem directly. This model allows WarVOX to find and classify a wide range of interesting lines, including modems, faxes, voice mail boxes, PBXs, loops, dial tones, IVRs, and forwarders using signal processing techniques.

=== AxMan ===
AxMan is an ActiveX fuzzing engine. The goal of AxMan is to discover vulnerabilities in COM objects exposed through Internet Explorer. Since AxMan is web-based, any security changes in the browser will also affect the results of the fuzzing process.

=== Metasploit Decloaking Engine ===
The Metasploit Decloaking Engine is a system for identifying the real IP address of a web user, regardless of proxy settings, using a combination of client-side technologies and custom services. No vulnerabilities are exploited by this tool. A properly configured Tor setup should not result in any identifying information being exposed.

=== Rogue Network Link Detection Tools ===
The Rogue Network Link Detection Tools are designed to detect unauthorized outbound network links on large corporate networks. These tools send spoofed TCP SYN and ICMP Echo Requests with the original destination IP encoded into the packet, which can then be read back out by an external listening host.

== Reception ==
Moore's work has gained him both praise and antagonism in the industry. Companies such as Microsoft have credited him with discovering vulnerabilities, yet some criticism of Metasploit and similar tools, due to their capacity for criminal use (rather than just offensive security), has fallen upon Moore himself. Moore has been warned by US law enforcement about his involvement in the Critical.IO scanning project.
