= Chris Lamprecht =

American software developer

- Born: Christopher Matthew Lamprecht
- Other names: MinorThreat, mthreat
- Occupations: Software developer, entrepreneur
- Years active: 1990s–present
- Known for: First person banned from the Internet; First employee and lead architect at Indeed.com; Founder of Searchify
- Notable work: ToneLoc; IndexTank
- Status: Released (March 3, 2000)
- Criminal charge: Money laundering
- Penalty: 70 months imprisonment, Internet ban until 2004

Chris Lamprecht (known as MinorThreat or mthreat) is an American software developer based in Texas. Lamprecht was the original author of ToneLoc, a wardialing program written in the C programming language for MS-DOS. He was the first employee and lead software architect for Indeed.com, a metasearch engine for job listings.

In 1995, Chris Lamprecht was sentenced to 70 months in prison for money laundering. As part of his sentence he was banned from using the Internet until 2004—the first person to receive such a penalty. He was released in 2000.

== Career ==
Lamprecht authored the computer wardialer program ToneLoc in the 1990s. After losing the original source code, it was re-written with the assistance of Mucho Maas. Lamprecht presented a talk detailing ToneLoc in 1993 at the SummerCon conference.

Lamprecht founded and worked for Searchify, a startup company offering an Internet hosting service for searches, marketed with a software as a service, which is based upon the open source software IndexTank. IndexTank was acquired by LinkedIn and open sourced in 2011.

== Imprisonment and release ==
Lamprecht is regarded as the first person to be banned from accessing the Internet, in 1995. The March 1997 issue of Swing Magazine contained an article by J.D.Heiman titled "Banned from the Internet" that publicly called this to attention in a story about Lamprecht. After being sentenced to 70 months in prison for money laundering, Lamprecht was also given a punishment of no access to the Internet until 2004.

Christopher Matthew Lamprecht had the Federal Bureau of Prisons ID# 61153-080 and was released on March 3, 2000.

Under the order of Judge Sam Sparks of the US District Court in 1995, Lamprecht was ordered to 70 months in the Federal Correctional Institution, Bastrop. Though a known computer hacker, the 24-year-old was never tried, nor pleaded guilty for computer related crimes, making it the more unusual that he was not allowed to access the Internet. In 1997 Lamprecht co-authored an article in Phrack Magazine issue #52 while incarcerated in a federal penitentiary, and the issue was published in 1998 with portions appearing in 2600 Magazine; and "prophiled" in Phrack issue #46 (1994).

In 2002 Judge Sam Sparks released Lamprecht from his term of supervised release, effectively lifting his Internet ban as well.

== See also ==
- Kevin Poulsen
