= ToneLoc =

War dialing computer program

ToneLoc was a popular war dialing computer program for MS-DOS written in the early to mid-1990s by two programmers known by the pseudonyms Minor Threat (Chris Lamprecht) and Mucho Maas. The name ToneLoc was short for "Tone Locator" and was a word play on the name of the rap artist known as Tone Lōc.

ToneLoc took advantage of the extended return codes available on USRobotics modems (e.g., ATX6) to detect dial tones upon dialing a number and to detect when a human answered the phone in addition to scanning for other modems. Detection of voice numbers sped up the scanning process by disconnecting upon detecting a human instead of timing out waiting for a modem carrier signal. The detection of a dial tone after dialing a number allowed for users to search for poorly secured extenders which could be used to divert calls through.

On April 17, 2005, the source code for ToneLoc was released.

== See also ==
- WarVOX
