= Moabite =

Moabite may refer to:

- Moabites, the people of the Kingdom of Moab, in modern-day Jordan
- Moabite language, an extinct Canaanite dialect once spoken in Moab
- Ithmah the Moabite, one of King David's Mighty Warriors
- Ruth the Moabite, the main character in the Book of Ruth

== See also ==
- Moab (disambiguation)
- Moabi (disambiguation)
- Moabit, a neighborhood in Berlin, Germany
