= Sandstorm Enterprises =

Sandstorm Enterprises, Inc.
- Type: Privately Held
- Industry: computer software
- Founded: 1998
- Defunct: 2010
- Fate: Acquired
- Headquarters: Malden, Massachusetts, United States
- Key people: James VanBokkelen, Simson Garfinkel
- Products: NetIntercept; PhoneSweep
- Website: www.sandstorm.net

Sandstorm Enterprises was an American computer security software vendor founded in 1998 by Simson Garfinkel, James van Bokkelen, Gene Spafford, Dan Geer. In January 2010, it was purchased by NIKSUN, Inc.

Sandstorm was located in the greater Boston area. Sandstorm's major products were PhoneSweep, the first commercial multi-line telephone scanner (a war dialer), introduced in 1998, and NetIntercept, a commercial network forensics tool, introduced in 2001. Designed as a second-generation network analysis tool, NetIntercept operated primarily at the level of TCP and UDP data streams and application-layer objects they transport.

In 2002 Sandstorm purchased LanWatch, a commercial packet-oriented LAN monitor originally developed by FTP Software. LanWatch was sold a separate product, but much of its functionality was used by NetIntercept to display individual packets.

As of 2019, the PhoneSweep product is still sold and supported by NIKSUN. Core parts of the NetIntercept product also still exist, as incorporated into NIKSUN's own NetDetector network forensics product line.
