= Database Nation =

Database Nation: The Death of Privacy in the 21st Century
- Author: Simson Garfinkel
- Language: English
- Published: 2000
- Publisher: O'Reilly Media
- Publication place: United States
- ISBN: 1-56592-653-6

Database Nation is a non-fiction book written by Simson Garfinkel and published in January 2000. In his book, Garfinkel calls on regular people to be aware of what information they are forced to give away, and he calls on the government to protect privacy by passing relevant laws.

== Content ==
Database Nation gives a general overview of information collection and ownership, GIS and GPS data, purchasing data and other topics related to privacy along with examples of how privacy gets breached. For example, Garfinkel tells a story about a customer who had slipped and fallen on the supermarket's property and decided to sue the supermarket. In response, the supermarket threatened to damage customer's reputation by disclosing the fact that they frequently purchased alcohol. Special attention is given to medical privacy. For instance, Garfinkel tells how Medical Information Bureau collects medical information and sells it to insurance companies.

Garfinkel shows that, due to the market forces, the technology has a tendency to get more privacy-invasive, especially the technology involving computerization, since the technology that enhances privacy gets more expensive. For example, credit-issuing companies are not interested in spending more money on their security procedures, and this leads to an increase in identity theft.

Garfinkel calls on the government to outlaw blanket consents and to restrict what an agreement can demand from the customer in its terms and conditions. Also, he appeals to the government to bring back the Office of Technology Assessment which was closed in 1995. One of the objectives of the OTA was to "identify existing or probable impacts of technology or technological programs", and it had published many reports dealing with privacy issues.
