= WiFi-Where =

Software tool

- Developer: 3Jacks Software
- Stable release: 1.0.0 / January 2010; 16 years ago
- Operating system: iOS, Palm OS
- License: Commercial
- Website: www.threejacks.com/wifiwhere

WiFi-Where was a tool that facilitated Wardriving and detection of wireless LANs using the 802.11b, 802.11a and 802.11g WLAN standards. Versions existed for the operating systems iOS and Palm OS. Originally created in June 2004 for the Palm OS by Jonathan Hays of Hazelware Software, the IP for WiFi-Where was licensed to 3Jacks Software in 2009. An iPhone version of the application was released in January 2010, but was pulled from the App Store by Apple in March 2010. The app was frequently listed as a common tool to facilitate Wardriving As of 2010, it is still available in the Jailbroken Cydia store.

== App store removal ==
WiFi-Where was one of many applications that were suddenly purged by Apple in March 2010. Apple never commented publicly on the reasons why other than that they accessed 'private frameworks.' This removal of an entire category of software from the App Store pushed Wardriving software to other platforms such as Android and Windows.

== Uses ==
The program was commonly used for:

- Verifying network configurations
- Finding locations with poor coverage in a WLAN
- Detecting causes of wireless interference
- Detecting unauthorized (rogue) access points
- Wardriving

== Features ==
Some of the unique features that the program implemented were:

- Continuous scanning mode
- GPS logging (when a device supports it)
- Email scan results
- Email attachments (OS 3.0 only) in NetStumbler .ns1, CSV, or Google Earth KML formats
- Option to filter hotspots by signal strength and location accuracy
- Displays detailed information about each network, including name/SSID, signal strength, raw RSSI value, security and authentication modes (WEP/WPA/WPA2), location, MAC address
- Save passwords for secure networks
- Upload hotspots to popular wardriving website Wigle.net
