= Skyhook Wireless =

American location technology company

Skyhook
- Founded: 2003; 23 years ago
- Founder: Ted Morgan and Michael Shean
- Defunct: 2022; 4 years ago
- Fate: Acquired by Qualcomm
- Headquarters: Boston, Massachusetts, United States
- Key people: Craig Waggy (CEO)
- Products: Wi-Fi positioning system
- Number of employees: 75
- Website: www.skyhook.com

Skyhook was a location technology company based in Boston, Massachusetts, specializing in location positioning. Founded in 2003, Skyhook initially focused on geolocating Wi-Fi access points by wardriving for commercial purposes. Skyhook transitioned to developing hybrid positioning.

== History ==
Skyhook was founded in 2003 by Ted Morgan and Michael Shean. Skyhook's database was initially gathered through wardriving, when the company sent teams of drivers around the United States, Canada, Western Europe, and selected Asian countries to map out Wi-Fi hotspots.

In April 2010, Apple decided to switch iPhones running on iPhone OS 3.2 and newer to their own location database after previously using a combination of Skyhook's and Google's.

In September 2010, Skyhook sued Google over the use of Wi-Fi locator technology in cell phones. The complaint claimed that Andy Rubin, Google's Vice President for Engineering, gave Sanjay K. Jha, Chief Executive of Motorola's mobile devices' division, a "stop ship" order, preventing Motorola from shipping phones with the Android operating system using the Skyhook software. The litigation was settled in 2015, with Skyhook receiving $90 million in a settlement with the tech giant, a third of which was spent on legal fees. The figure was shown in a securities filing by Liberty Broadband Corporation, Skyhook's Colorado-based parent company.

In February 2014, Skyhook Wireless was acquired by True Position Inc., a subsidiary of Liberty Broadband. In 2016, the two companies merged under the Skyhook brand, now under Liberty Broadband, which is a part of the Liberty Media family. Skyhook also introduced a range of products: Retailer Personas, Power Personas, and On-Demand Personas.

In February 2019, Skyhook announced that it was working closely with Qualcomm Technologies to bring Wi-Fi positioning and location-assistance services based on Qualcomm Snapdragon Wear platforms. In September 2019, Mozilla announced changes to commercial use of its Mozilla Location Service, which resulted in SailfishOS location services not being able to use the service anymore. The changes were made due to patent infringement allegations by Skyhook. In February 2020, Deutsche Telekom announced that Skyhook became one of its technology partners. In April 2020, Skyhook partnered with Kyocera to provide location services to DuraXV Extreme, a rugged flip phone. Skyhook and Combain announced a collaboration in a common press release issued in April 2020.

In 2022, Qualcomm acquired Skyhook.

== Services ==
Skyhook offered a software development kit, which allowed developers to create location-enabled applications using Skyhook's software. The SDK supported Android 2.2 (Froyo), 2.3.x (Gingerbread), 4.0.x (Ice Cream Sandwich), 4.1.x (Jelly Bean), 4.4 (KitKat), 5.0-5.1 (Lollipop), and 6.0 (Marshmallow), including forked platforms such as the Kindle Fire, along with Linux, Windows, and Mac OS X.

== See also ==
- Hybrid positioning system
- Mobile phone tracking
- Local Positioning Systems
- Wi-Fi positioning system
