= Marian Garfinkel =

American yoga teacher (1932–2020)

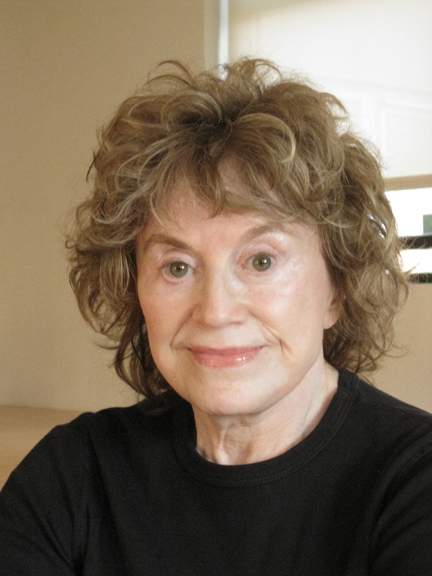
- Garfinkel in 2008
- Born: April 2, 1932; Altoona, Pennsylvania, US
- Died: August 28, 2020 (aged 88); Wyncote, Pennsylvania, US
- Occupation: Yoga teacher
- Known for: Iyengar Yoga
- Spouse: Marvin Garfinkel
- Children: Simson Garfinkel

Marian S. Garfinkel (April 2, 1932 – August 28, 2020) was an early researcher in the field of complementary medicine, showing that yoga could be used to treat and possibly cure a variety of hand injuries resulting from repetitive use. She studied with B. K. S. Iyengar for over 40 years, making annual trips to yoga centers in India, France, California and Michigan. As a result of her contact with Iyengar, she and her former husband Marvin Garfinkel are credited with inspiring the sculptor Robert Engman to create the sculpture After Iyengar, currently on display at the Morris Arboretum at the University of Pennsylvania and at the Hirshhorn Museum and Sculpture Garden in Washington DC.

== Life ==
Garfinkel grew up in Altoona, Pennsylvania, the youngest of four children. She taught at Linden Hall, a prep school for girls, from 1955 to 1957. After the death of her first husband she married Marvin Garfinkel in 1963. She studied art at the Barnes Foundation under Violette de Mazia, who she considered a friend. She moved from Center City, Philadelphia to Merion Station before settling at Cobble Court in 1974. She returned to Philadelphia in 1986.

Following the award of her degree, Garfinkel assumed teaching positions at the University of Pennsylvania and Temple University.

Garfinkel was especially interested in using yoga to treat diseases of the hand, including osteoarthritis as well as repetitive strain injuries.

Garfinkel was a senior certified Iyengar teacher who was a student of B. K. S. Iyengar between 1974, when she first met him in Ann Arbor, MI, and his death in 2014.

In 2016, Garfinkel's extensive archives regarding B. K. S. Iyengar were donated to the Iyengar Yoga National Association of the United States (IYANUS).

== Research ==
Garfinkel's 1992 Dissertation showed that yoga and various relaxation techniques were a workable treatment for the pain and mobility issues associated with osteoarthritis.

In 1994 Garfinkel was the lead author of a study that showed that yoga could be used for treatment of osteoarthritis of the hands, and in 1998, Garfinkel was lead author of a study in the Journal of the American Medical Association demonstrating that yoga could be used to relieve the symptoms of carpal tunnel syndrome. At the time of the article's publication, Garfinkel was in India, studying with Iyengar. On her return from India, she discovered over 900 e-mail messages in her inbox, many from people who were eager to see if she could help them. In 2000, she published an article co-authored with H. Ralph Schumacher, Jr. presenting the ability of Yoga to cure a variety of rheumatic diseases.
