= Cyril Houri =

French engineer

Cyril Lionel Houri (born April 1969 in Meudon, Hauts-de-Seine, France) is a New York-based inventor and entrepreneur who has founded two geolocation technology companies: InfoSplit, Inc. and Mexens Technology Inc. (now called Navizon). Houri is recognized as one of the inventors of IP address geolocation, and has contributed in the advance of WiFi and cellular positioning technologies. For his expertise, he testified as an expert witness on location-based technology in LICRA vs. Yahoo!.

Houri's education began in Paris, and he later earned a Master of Science degree in engineering and computer science from the National Polytechnic Institute of Toulouse in 1992. In 1996, he relocated to New York City, where he initially worked on financial software design. In 1999, Houri founded InfoSplit Inc., a pioneer in IP geolocation, which identifies the geographic location of an Internet user. Houri designed and patented some of the technology that is now commonly used to geolocate website visitors.

== Inventions and Innovations ==
=== IP Geolocation ===
Cyril Houri is credited as one of the key inventors of IP geolocation, a technology that identifies the geographical location of an internet user based on their IP address. This technology, developed in the late 1990s through his company InfoSplit Inc., became crucial for industries such as advertising, fraud prevention, and content localization. As mentioned by Jack Goldsmith, former Assistant Attorney General, in his book Who Controls the Internet? Illusions of a Borderless World,

=== WiFi triangulation – global positioning ===
In 2005, Houri founded Mexens Technology Inc., which developed Navizon, a Wi-Fi and cellular signal triangulation and geolocation system. This system allows mobile devices to pinpoint user location based on nearby Wi-Fi hotspots and cellular towers, offering a solution for outdoor and indoor positioning where GPS signals may be weak. Navizon is a patented technology based on a collaborative database compiled by users with GPS devices who collect positional information of Wi-Fi hotspots and cellular signals. Navizon has been the first GPS solution for IPhone, when a GPS module was not available on the first models.

Navizon’s technology significantly contributed to the development of both global positioning systems based on a combination of satellite GPS, WiFi signals and cellular towers, and modern indoor tracking systems used in retail and other industries.

When using location services on smartphones, for example, the satellite positioning is often corrected by using WiFi signals, leveraging Houri's invention. Smartphones scan for nearby Wi-Fi access points and send a list of detected networks (along with their MAC addresses and signal strength) to a server. The server compares this data against an extensive database of Wi-Fi and cellular signal information, estimating the user’s location with improved precision.

This hybrid approach, leveraging both GPS and Wi-Fi/cellular signals, has made location services more reliable and accurate, particularly in environments where satellite signals struggle.

=== Wi-Fi triangulation – indoor positioning ===
In 2011, Navizon released its Indoor Triangulation System (I.T.S.), a Wi-Fi positioning system to track WiFi enabled devices such as smartphones, tablets and notebooks, to analyze people's traffic inside a building or throughout a venue with room-level accuracy.

=== Buddy Finder app – Find My Friends ===
In 2007, Houri's company Navizon introduced the “Buddy Finder” app, one of the early location-based social applications. This app, initially available for Apple devices, enabled users to locate friends nearby using Wi-Fi and cellular signals, pre-dating many modern social geolocation apps.

In 2018 Agis Software sued Apple for a patent infringement for the Find My Friends app. Houri was called by Apple to testify and named as co-defendant, to provide early documentation for the Buddy Finder from Navizon, in order to demonstrate that it was prior art to Agis Software's patent.

== The LICRA vs. Yahoo! case ==
In 2000, Yahoo! was sued by two French anti-racism groups, namely LICRA (International League Against Racism and Anti-Semitism) and UEFJ, demanding that Yahoo! France prevent French web users from accessing English-language auction sites offering Nazi memorabilia, which are illegal in France. Yahoo! argued in court that it was technically impossible to block only French web surfers from the site. Houri was called to testify on behalf of the plaintiff groups and demonstrated that geolocation technology could be used to block at least 90% of France-based users from accessing the offending Yahoo! sites. The court ruled for the plaintiffs and ordered Yahoo! to block French web users from accessing the unlawful content.
