= OpenCelliD =

Collaborative community project that collects GPS positions of cell towers

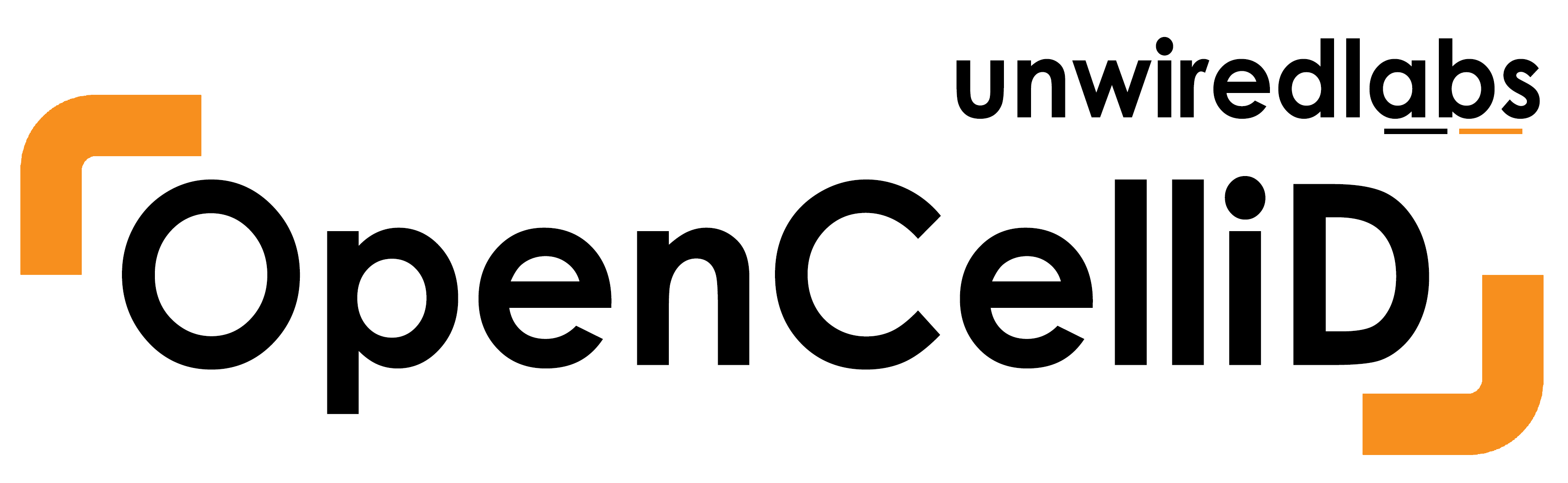
- Website type: Collaborative cell spotting
- Available in: English
- Country of origin: France
- Owner: Unwired Labs
- Creator: Thomas Landspurg
- Website: opencellid.org
- Commercial: Yes
- Registration: Required for software developers
- Launched: 2 April 2008; 18 years ago
- Current status: Online
- Content license: CC BY-SA 4.0

OpenCelliD is a collaborative community project that collects GPS positions of cell towers and their corresponding location area identity.

More than 49,000 contributors are registered with OpenCelliD, contributing more than 1 million new measurements every day on average to the OpenCelliD database. As of August 21, 2017 the database contained 35.5 million unique cells and 2.1 billion unique measurements.

OpenCelliD publishes an aggregate data set of cell locations licensed under a Creative Commons Attribution-ShareAlike 4.0 International License with the intention of promoting free use and redistribution of the data.

== Applications ==
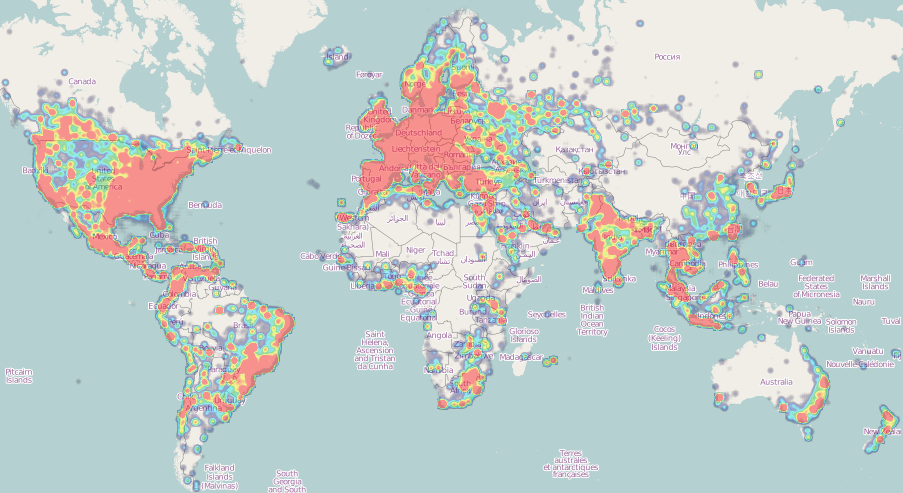
OpenCelliD heatmap, 2013

Data on Cell IDs and their locations can be used to provide location information to mobile devices. Using Cell ID locations to find device location is more power efficient and often faster than using satellite-based navigation systems, although it is less precise because of the lack of known Cell IDs. The database is also used to determine the strength of available wireless connections and which mobile phone service providers have coverage in specific geographic locations.

== Data sources ==
The unique location area identities of the cell towers can be collected by devices that utilize the wireless network provided by those cell towers. This data is primarily contributed by smartphone users who have installed apps, such as OpenCelliD or OpenCelliD Client, and commercial tracking devices such as blackboxes, but also by wholesale data donation by corporations. This is then collected and transferred into the OpenCelliD API database.

== Licensing ==
The OpenCelliD database is published under a Creative Commons Attribution-ShareAlike 4.0 International License open content license with the intention of promoting free use and redistribution of the data.
