= Federal Correctional Institution, Bastrop =

Low-security prison in Texas, US

Coordinates: 30°11′30″N 97°18′28″W

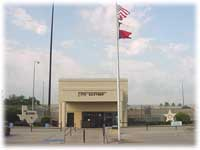
- Interactive map of Federal Correctional Institution, Bastrop
- Location: Camp Swift, Bastrop County, Texas
- Status: Operational
- Security class: "Administrative Low"-security
- Capacity: 793 (currently houses approx 1300)
- Opened: 1979
- Managed by: Federal Bureau of Prisons

Federal Correctional Institution, Bastrop (FCI Bastrop) is an administrative-low-security United States federal prison for male inmates in Camp Swift, Texas. It is operated by the Federal Bureau of Prisons, a division of the United States Department of Justice. The facility also has an adjacent satellite prison camp that houses minimum-security offenders.

FCI Bastrop is located 8 miles (13 km) north of the city of Bastrop and 30 miles (48 km) southeast of Austin.

== Notable incidents ==
On November 20, 2009, inmates Leandro Luna, 52, and Adan Chavez, 53, escaped from FCI Bastrop. The two were able to simply walk away from the facility since they were being held at the minimum-security prison camp, which has no perimeter fence. Hector Gomez, a Deputy US Marshal assigned to the Lone Star Fugitive Task Force, a team of law enforcement agents consisting of local authorities, Texas Rangers and US Marshals, said the escape had probably been in the works "for a long time" and that the task force believed that Luna and Chavez, who were serving sentences for narcotics convictions, were attempting to flee to Mexico. It took authorities two days to notify the public of the escape. Prison officials would not elaborate on the specifics of the escape or why the public was not notified sooner. Six days after the escape, Mexican authorities apprehended Luna and Chavez in Ciudad Acuña, Mexico, across from the border city of Del Rio, Texas. It was subsequently discovered that Luna and Chavez had stolen a Federal Bureau of Prisons vehicle during their escape, which was recovered in a parking lot in East Austin, Texas.

== Notable inmates ==
=== Current ===
Inmate Name	Register Number	Photo	Status	Details
Aaron Morel 'Mo' LeBaron	72697-079		Sentenced to 540 months; scheduled for release in 2033.	Cult leader and son of Ervil LeBaron; convicted of his role in four murders.
Jon Woods	14657-010		Sentenced to 220 months; scheduled for release in 2033.	Arkansas state senator from 2013 to 2017; found guilty of conspiracy to commit mail fraud, twelve counts of wire fraud, and money laundering. Woods was accused of soliciting and accepting kickbacks for the distribution of government funds.

=== Former ===
Inmate Name	Register Number	Photo	Status	Details
Sam Hurd	44162-424		Released from custody in 2023; served 10 years.	Former National Football League player; pleaded guilty in 2013 to conspiracy to possess with intent to distribute a controlled substance in connection with his attempt to form a cocaine and marijuana ring in Chicago, Illinois.
Richard Causey	29261-179		Released from custody in 2011; served 4 years.	Former chief accountant of the now-defunct Enron Corporation; pleaded guilty to securities fraud for misleading shareholders about Enron's financial problems prior to the company's 2001 collapse.
Chris Lamprecht	61153-080		Released from custody in 2000; served 5 years.	Computer hacker; known as the first person to be legally barred from using the Internet; pleaded guilty to money laundering in 1995 for stealing and selling telecommunications equipment.
Yassein Said	06584-509		Serving a 12 year sentence; scheduled for release in 2029. Currently at FMC Fort Worth.	Convicted of conspiracy to help shield a fugitive in the case of his brother Yaser Abdel Said.

== See also ==
- List of U.S. federal prisons
- Federal Bureau of Prisons
- Incarceration in the United States
