= State v. Allen =

1996 decision of the Kansas Supreme Court

- Court: Supreme Court of Kansas
- Full case name: State of Kansas v. Anthony A. Allen
- Decided: 1996
- Citation: 260 Kan. 107 (1996)

Case history
- Prior action: A preliminary hearing in a trial court failed to show probable cause that the defendant had committed a crime.

Case opinions
- The Kansas Supreme Court affirmed the findings of the trial court.

Keywords
- Probable cause; wardialing

State v. Allen was a 1996 decision of the Kansas Supreme Court regarding what constitutes the unlawful access of a computer system. The court upheld the decision of the trial court, finding that the state had failed to show probable cause that the defendant, Anthony A. Allen, had unlawfully accessed the computer systems of the Southwestern Bell Telephone Company.

== Background ==
Eighteen-year-old Anthony Allen had programmed his computer to wardial phone numbers to determine which were simply voice lines and which had modems attached to them. Some of the numbers he dialed, and subsequently disconnected from, included computers owned by Southwestern Bell. These were numbers which were thought to be known only to Bell employees and their associates. However, although Allen succeeded in identifying numbers with attached modems, no evidence was provided that he attempted to make any attempt to get past the system's login screens which required a username and password.

A Kansas trial court found that a preliminary hearing had failed to show probable cause that Allen had unlawfully accessed Southwestern Bell's computer systems. Because probable cause was not established the defendant was released without going to trial. The state then appealed the trial court's decision to the Kansas Supreme Court, asking them to rule on "the question of whether a person's telephonic connections that prompt a computer owner to change its security systems constitute felony computer crime in violation of K.S.A. 21-3755(b)."

== Decision ==
The Kansas Supreme Court's decision answered two separate questions. The first was in regard to whether the trial court erred in ruling there was not sufficient evidence that Allen had gained "access" to Southwestern Bell's computers. The second question was whether the trial court had erred in ruling that there was no evidence to show that Allen had damaged any computer, or any other property.

=== On the question of access ===
The first question that the State Supreme Court set out to answer regarded the question of "access", and how it is defined in Kansas state law. Specifically, from the ruling, "Did the trial court err in ruling there was insufficient evidence to show Allen gained "access" to Southwestern Bell's computers?" This question came about because of the trial court's decision that there was not probable cause to believe Allen had committed the crime he was charged with.

The prosecution had alleged that since K.S.A. 21-3755(a)(1), defined access as "to approach, instruct, communicate with, store data in, retrieve data from, or otherwise make use of any resources of a computer, computer system or computer network", by dialing the Bell's number and connecting to it Allen had "approached" Bell's computer system, thereby committing a crime. The Supreme Court rejected this idea, stating that the intent of the statute was to criminalize the misuse of a computer system by "gaining or attempting to gain access" to it. Since Allen had disconnected from the systems he connected to without trying to enter a password he had not attempted to gain access to them and therefore committed no offense. Furthermore, the Supreme Court pointed out that, as noted by the Department of Justice, if merely approaching a computer was regarded as an offense then anyone who walked near a computer could be charged with a crime; this effectively rendered the "access" notion void for vagueness.

=== On the question of damages ===
The second question the Supreme Court sought to address regarded the issue of damages. Specifically, "Did the trial court err in ruling that no evidence showed Allen had damaged any computer, computer system, computer network, or any other property?" The prosecution, during the lower court hearing, had alleged that Allen caused damages to the Southwestern Bell Company by dialing into the system in question. Their reasoning was that since after Allen had dialed into their computers Southwestern Bell had upgraded their security systems, and therefore Allen was responsible for the costs of the upgrades. The trial court rejected this argument reasoning that Allen's actions were akin to someone looking at a no trespassing sign posted on a gate, causing the owner of the property to decide to add a new lock. The Supreme Court affirmed this decision, stating that the prosecution's argument was ultimately circular: if costs were incurred to determine whether an act was criminal or not, then the act was criminal since costs were incurred. The Supreme Court noted that, although investigation costs may be included in restitution payments paid by a defendant after they have been shown to be guilty, they do not in and of themselves constitute evidence against the accused.

== Legislative changes ==
After the Kansas Supreme Court's decision in 1996 that the lower court had been correct in dismissing the charges against Allen, the 1997 Kansas legislative session updated the statute under which Allen had been charged. House bill number 2058 amended KSA 21-3755 to, among other things, strike the word "approach" from subsection (1). The changes to the relevant sections, which had been in question during the Allen case (see On the question of access and On the question of damages above) read as follows:

(1) Access means to ~~approach,~~ instruct, communicate with, store data in, retrieve data from~~,~~ or otherwise make use of any resources of a computer, computer system or computer network.

...

(b) (1) Computer crime is:
~~(1)~~ (A) Intentionally and without authorization ~~gaining or attempting to gain access to~~ accessing ~~or attempting to access~~ and damaging, modifying, altering, destroying, copying, disclosing or taking possession of a computer, computer system, computer network or any other property;

...

~~(c) (1)~~ (2) ~~(A)~~ Computer crime ~~which causes a loss of the value of less than $500 is a class A nonperson misdemeanor.~~
~~(2) (B) Computer crime which causes a loss of the value of at least $500 but less than $25,000 is a severity level 9, nonperson felony.~~
~~(3) (C) Computer crime which causes a loss of the value of $25,000 or more is a severity level 7, nonperson felony.~~ is a severity level 8, nonperson felony.

–HB 2058

It is unclear whether the intentions of HB 2058 were entirely due to the result of State v. Allen, however it seems likely since: 1) the bill was passed during the next legislative session after the trial, and 2) the bill amended 2 segments of KSA 21-3755—both of which were significant questions in the Allen case.

In 2010 with HB-2668 for recodification, KSA 21-3755 was repealed and replaced with KSA 21-5839.
