= OTDOA =

OTDOA (Observed Time Difference Of Arrival) is a positioning feature introduced in rel9 E-UTRA (LTE radio). It's a multilateration method in which the User Equipment (UE) measures the time difference between some specific signals from several eNodeBs and reports these time differences to a specific device in the network (the ESMLC). The ESMLC based on these time differences and knowledge of the enodeBs locations calculates the UEs' position.

== Background ==
In December 2008, due to regulatory requirements like the E911, which require that it should be possible to locate UEs with a certain accuracy, a work item was proposed in the 3GPP TSG-RAN42 meeting. This proposed between others the study of the feasibility of OTDOA. OTDOA was meant to work in a similar way as the 3G IPL feature.

During the summer of 2009 the necessary changes to the RAN1 36.211, 36.212, 36.213 and 36.214 specifications were accepted. And a bit later the RAN4 requirements and RAN2 protocol related matters settled.

== Technology ==
A OTDOA procedure works as follows: The ESMLC requests through the LPP layer an OTDOA measurement: a set of RSTD (Reference Signal Time Difference) measurements from the UE. Together with this request the UE receives assistance data. This assistance data, provides a list of cells (enodeBs), with their PRS (Positioning Reference Signal) parameters, including BW, periodicity etc.

The UE then proceeds to perform these measurements during a given period of time (typically up to 8 or 16 periods of the PRS signals). These measurements consist on estimating the exact time offsets between the PRS from different cells. Then it reports to the ESMLC these estimated time differences together with an estimate of the measurement quality.

The ESMLC then, using these time difference estimates, and the knowledge of the cells positions and transmit time offsets estimates the position of the UE.

The description of the LPP (LTE positioning protocol) can be found in the 36.355 specification. The exact details of the PRS signals can be found in section 6.10.4 of the 36.211 specification. And a simple OTDOA procedure can be found in the RAN5 OTDOA testcases' descriptions in section 9 of the 37.571-1 specification

From a UE architecture perspective the LPP layer resides outside of the EUTRAN protocol stack, over NAS, but typically implemented in the cellular modem firmware. The UE RSTD measurements themselves would be performed by the L1 layer.

== Adoption ==
OTDOA is an optional feature in the 3GPP LTE standard. This means that it is optional for networks and UEs to support it while still being deemed LTE compatible. Like with other similar optional features, interest by particular carriers depends on regulatory requirements, and for UE vendors in carrier's requirements, as major carriers run their own certification tests on UEs which aim at operating in their network.
