= The Entrepreneurship Cell, IIT Bombay =

- The Entrepreneurship Cell, IIT Bombay
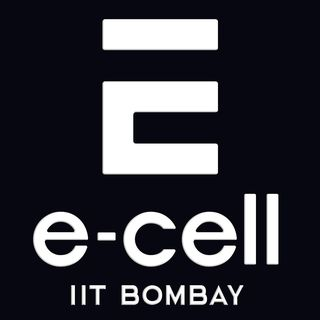
- Official Logo of E-Cell, IIT Bombay
- Abbreviation: E-Cell, IITB
- Founded: 1998; 28 years ago
- Founded at: IIT Bombay
- Type: Non-profit organization
- Legal status: Active
- Purpose: Entrepreneurship
- Headquarters: Student Activity Center; IIT Bombay
- Location: Mumbai, India
- Region served: India and overseas
- Website: ecell.in

The Entrepreneurship Cell, IIT Bombay, also known as E-Cell, IIT Bombay, is the primary entrepreneurship promoting body of the Indian Institute of Technology Bombay, managed and run completely by the students of the institute. It organizes initiatives like the annual business plan competition Eureka! and the flagship event, The Entrepreneurship Summit (E-Summit) in January each year, which receives a footfall of over 30,000 people who include students, investors, corporates, mentors, celebrities and the most important; Entrepreneurs.

== History ==
In October 1998, The Entrepreneurship Cell was formed by the students of IIT Bombay with the mission of promoting the culture of entrepreneurship within the campus of IIT Bombay. E-Cell IIT Bombay was one of the founding members of the National Entrepreneurship Network.

In 1999, 'Right Half', the first campus startup of IIT Bombay and any engineering institute in India was founded by Mayank Jain (B.Tech, Civil) , Anshuman Bapna (B.Tech EE) and Kashyap Deorah (B. Tech, CSE, Batch of 2000) in their final year.

In 2000, business incubator SINE was inaugurated by Mr. Nandan Nilekani (Founder & Ex-CEO, Infosys) and Mr. Kanwal Rekhi (Venture Capitalist & Director, TiE). The incubator jump starts with 8 startups in the year.

In 2008, E-Cell, IIT Bombay represented India and the Indian sub-continent at the `Global Conference of E-Cells’ organized by Massachusetts Institute of Technology at Madrid, Spain in April 2008.

In 2010, 1985 batch of IIT-B decides to support Eureka.

In 2011, E-Cell officially collaborated with E-Bootcamp organized by BASES (Business Association of Stanford Entrepreneurial Students), Stanford University for Eureka!

In 2014, the first edition of The Ten Minute Million Challenge (TTMM) was held. The competition provided on-spot funding to its participants.

In 2015, FCoF, a platform to connect startups to freelancers and their potential co-founders was launched. Alongside, Startup Services Platform (SSP) was launched to provide legal and financial consultancies to startups at minimal rates. E-Summit was provided patronage from GoI's flagship initiative Make in India. E-Summit saw the edition of two new events, Business Conclave and Innovation Conclave.

In 2017, Swacch and EnTech were initiated. Swacch was a social campaign that encouraged the people of Mumbai to keep the public spaces clean. EnTech envisioned to support and increase the technology startups from IIT Bombay.

In 2018, Pre-Summit, an initiative aimed at promoting the E-Summit was launched.

In 2020, E-Summit is taken completely online in order to adapt with the pandemic.

In 2024, E-Cell IIT Bombay hosted E-Summit ’24 on 3–4 February. As part of the summit, “The Ten Minute Million” event allowed startups to pitch to 16 investors for funding of up to ₹2.4 million. The lineup of on-campus competitions included events such as IPL Auction, Leader’s Quest, Bid & Build, Corporate Duel, Fish Tank, and Ace the Case, with prize money exceeding ₹1 lakh.

== Initiatives ==
=== Desai Sethi School for Entrepreneurship ===
IIT Bombay established an Entrepreneurship Centre at its premises, with a generous funding received from Mr. Bharat Desai and Ms. Neerja Sethi, under the aegis of The Desai Sethi Family Foundation. Initially named as Desai Sethi Centre for Entrepreneurship, it fosters entrepreneurship and technology innovation through relevant courses, laboratories and partnerships. Students in the programme receive instruction and mentorship from IIT Bombay faculty as well as distinguished guest faculty from leading international institutions and industry. The establishment of the Centre was announced by the Director of IIT Bombay during the inaugural session of Entrepreneurship Summit (E-Summit 2014), which was organized by the Entrepreneurship Cell of the Institute on 1–2 February 2014. Five years later, in December 2019, the Centre was renamed as Desai Sethi School for Entrepreneurship.

=== Deferred Placement Policy ===
With the start-up ecosystem of the institute flourishing and students being keener on taking up entrepreneurial challenges, the Placement Cell has played its part by announcing the introduction of the DPP(Deferred Placement Policy). This policy aims to encourage students who're looking to work on their own start-up idea by safeguarding them against the risk of having to forgo campus placements. According to this initiative, students interested in pursuing an entrepreneurial activity would be given an option to defer their placements by 2 years. The need for a DPP(Deferred Placement Policy) was envisaged due to the current trend of rising interest in entrepreneurship, partly owing to the success of The Entrepreneurship Cell's efforts in fostering an entrepreneurial culture within and outside the institute.

== See also ==
- Indian Institute of Technology Bombay
- Entrepreneurship
