= WarVOX =

Warvox
- Developer: Metasploit LLC
- Stable release: 1.0.1 / May 25, 2009
- Operating system: Linux
- Type: Security
- License: BSD
- Website: warvox.org at the Wayback Machine (archived 2013-10-26)

WarVOX was a free, open-source VOIP-based war dialing tool for exploring, classifying, and auditing phone systems. WarVOX processed audio from each call by using signal processing techniques and without the need of modems. WarVOX used VoIP providers over the Internet instead of modems used by other war dialers. It compared the pauses between words to identify numbers using particular voicemail systems.

WarVox was merged into the Metasploit Project in August 2011.

The WarVOX project is no longer maintained.

== See also ==
- H. D. Moore
- Metasploit
- Rapid7
- War dialing
- w3af
