= Warchalking =

Graffiti indicating open Wi-Fi

Warchalking symbols

Warchalking is the drawing of symbols in public places to advertise an open Wi-Fi network. Inspired by hobo symbols, the warchalking marks were conceived by a group of friends in June 2002 and published by Matt Jones who designed the set of icons and produced a downloadable document containing them. Within days of Jones publishing a blog entry about warchalking, articles appeared in dozens of publications and stories appeared on several major television news programs around the world.

The word is formed by analogy to wardriving, the practice of driving around an area in a car to detect open Wi-Fi nodes. That term in turn is based on wardialing, the practice of dialing many phone numbers hoping to find a modem.

There is a difference between wardriving and warchalking. Warchalking and wardriving both are used to share information about wireless networks. Warchalking is different from wardriving since warchalking involves marking public spaces with symbols indicating different types of Wi-Fi networks. Warchalking relies on visual cues, while wardriving involves driving around with a device to detect wireless access points. It is a method used to search for networks.

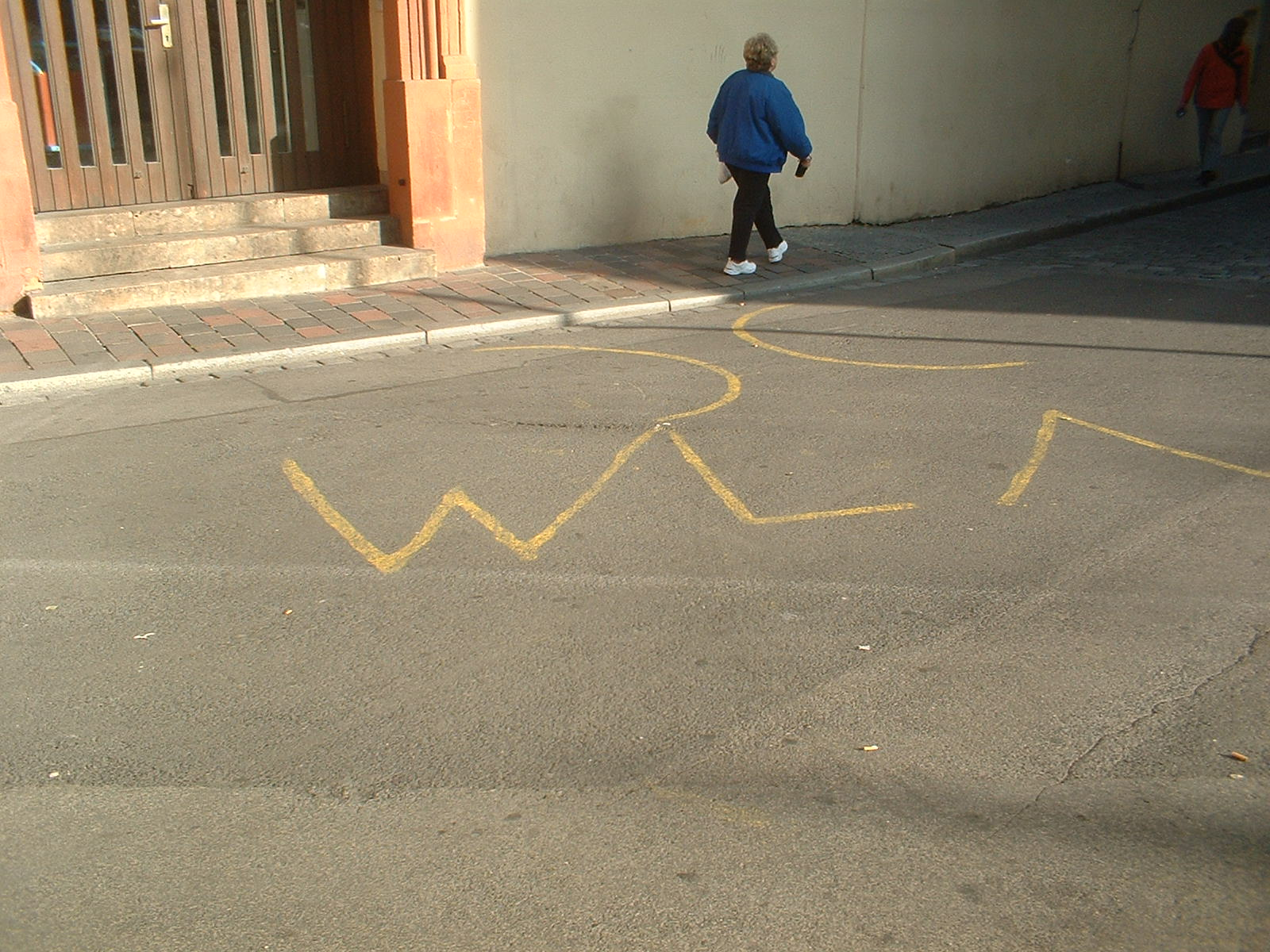
A warchalking sign on a street in Bamberg, Germany

Having found a Wi-Fi node, the warchalker draws a special symbol on a nearby object, such as a wall, the pavement, or a lamp post. Those offering Wi-Fi service might also draw such a symbol to advertise the availability of their Wi-Fi location, whether commercial or personal.

== Uses ==
Warchalking was used to mark wifi access points with chalk. However, weather would wash away symbols making them an impractical solution. It later evolved as a method to relate to a subcultural community, and learn about wireless connections.

In contrast, some sources suggest that because warchalking was the original work of hacker Matt Jones, it may have begun as a hobbyist activity.

== Criticism ==
Warchalking is considered to have been a misconception, particularly driven by media hype. A poll done by NetSlumber forms did not find any person to have chalked a wifi access point.

Further grassroots experimentation was overshadowed by the rise of GPS-enabled phones. The "hype" surrounding warchalking may have led to an overestimation of its practice.
