= Cobble Court =

Historic house in Pennsylvania, United States

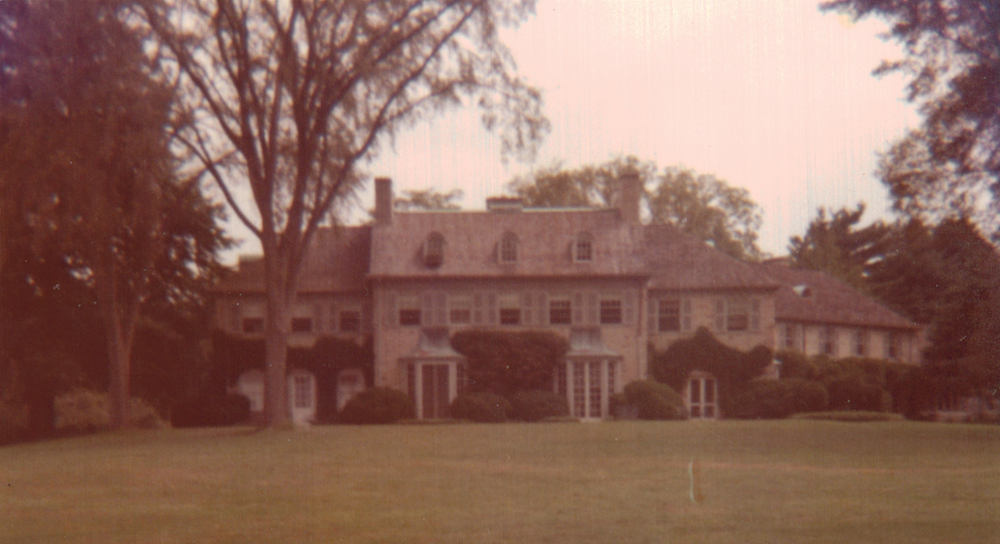
- Cobble Court in 1978

- Location within Pennsylvania
- 39.994129°N 75.327409°W
- Location: Delaware County, Pennsylvania

History
- Built: 1924

Site notes
- Area: Haverford, PA
- Architect: John Russell Pope

Cobble Court is a historic house originally commissioned by the distiller J. Hazeltine Carstairs, who owned 50 acres (20 ha) from Marple Road to Ardmore Avenue. Originally named Spring Hill Farm, the house was built alongside the first hole of the Merion Golf Club west course in 1924. Sold to Henry Bryer, the owner of Bryers, a prominent ice cream manufacturer, who installed the cobblestone courtyard, and changed the name to "Cobble Court." In 1963 the Breyers estate was subdivided and the main house sold to Stuart Saunders of the Pennsylvania Railroad. The property was purchased in 1973 from Stuart Saunders by Marian and Marvin Garfinkel.

The house is on the local survey of historic buildings. The home was designed by John Russell Pope, an architect who is also credited with designing the Jefferson Memorial and the National Gallery of Art.

== See also ==
- National Register of Historic Places listings in Delaware County, Pennsylvania
