= Demon dialing =

Use of computers to repeatedly enter telephone numbers; typically to hack into modems

In the computer hacking scene of the 1980s, demon dialing was a technique by which a computer was used to repeatedly dial a number (usually to a crowded modem pool) in an attempt to gain access immediately after another user had hung up. The expansion of accessible internet service provider connectivity since that time has rendered the practice more or less obsolete.

A similar technique was sometimes used to get the first call for prizes in radio "call-in" shows, thus leading to the adoption of random "fifth caller," "seventeenth caller" etc. by radio stations to circumvent this practice.

The term "demon dialing" derives from the Demon Dialer product from Zoom Telephonics, Inc., a telephone device produced in the 1980s which repeatedly dialed busy telephone numbers under control of an extension phone. The emergence of affordable consumer telephony devices with advanced features such as last number redial and preprogrammed numbers paralleled phone industry deregulation and the Breakup of the Bell System in the early 1980s. While Speed dial technology had been invented nearly a decade earlier by Bell Labs, it did not become a consumer product until deregulation. Previously, connecting non-AT&T handsets was generally prohibited and most phones were leased devices (similar to residential broadband routers). By putting its functionally in a line-connected appliance rather than a handset, the Demon Dialer device could be configured to provide speed dialing to all extensions within a residence through touch tone control.

Demon dialing was popularized by the movie WarGames, where the main character demonstrates this technique with a computer program. After giving the program an area code and 3 digit prefix, the program then serially dialed every phone number in that prefix in order, recording which phone numbers were answered by a computer modem. Soon after, most likely because it was popularized by the movie, serial dialing was outlawed. Hackers got around this by simply randomizing the order the program dialed all the numbers. Later the terms "demon dialing" and "war dialing" became synonymous.

== Similar technologies ==
Automatic redial is similar, but for modems, and included in most telecommunications programs that use modems, including all variants of dial-up networking included in the Windows operating system.

== See also ==
- Phreaking
