= SMLC =

Serving Mobile Location Center In GSM Networks, the SMLC is a network element that resides in the BSC (Base Station Controller) and calculates network-based location of mobile stations (handsets). The SMLC may control several LMUs (Location Measurement Units), which measure radio signals to help find mobile stations in the area served by the SMLC. It can calculate location using the TA (Timing Advance) method.

The SMLC communicates with the GMLC, which is the interface to external LCS clients.
