= Navizon =

American provider of location-based services

Navizon, Inc
- Type: Inc
- Industry: Telecommunications
- Founded: 2005
- Founder: Cyril Houri
- Headquarters: Miami, FL, United States
- Key people: Cyril Houri, CEO
- Products: Navizon Virtual GPS, Navizon Indoor Triangulation System, Navizon Indoors
- Services: Location-Based Services & Positioning Technologies
- Website: www.navizon.com

Navizon, Inc. is a provider of location-based services and products. Navizon was an early developer of technology that makes it possible to determine the geographic position of a mobile device using as reference the location of cell phone towers and Wi-Fi-based wireless access points instead of GPS. Navizon also developed technology for locating mobile devices indoors with room and floor-level accuracy.

Navizon, initially known as Mexens Technology, was founded by a team from the Internet Protocol geolocation market. Its founder and CEO, Cyril Houri, was founder and CEO of Infosplit, a provider of IP address geolocation services started in 1999 that was acquired in 2004.

== Global Positioning ==
In 2005, Mexens Technology, as Navizon, Inc. was formerly named, introduced Navizon, a hybrid positioning system combining Global Positioning System, Wi-Fi and cellular positioning. Mobile device users obtain their position through the Navizon app, which calculates the locations of cell sites and Wi-Fi access points by analyzing the signal strength at different locations. Navizon's database of cellular tower and Wi-Fi access point locations was built by a global community of users through crowdsourcing.

The Navizon app also provides access to features such as Buddy Finder, which allows users to find the location of other registered users, and incentives through the Navizon Rewards System, which allows users to earn rewards for contributing data through Navizon's crowdsourcing initiative.

Navizon's Geopositioning products and services include the Navizon app, for individuals, and wireless positioning systems for corporations. In March 2009, the Navizon Wi-Fi positioning system was licensed by Yahoo Mobile and in March 2010 Microsoft selected Navizon for Wi-Fi and Cellular positioning.

== Locating devices indoors - Indoor positioning system ==
In 2011, Navizon unveiled Indoor Triangulation System (I.T.S.), a Wi-Fi positioning system for businesses that tracks Wi-Fi enabled smart phones, tablets and notebooks, and gives a view of people traffic inside a building or throughout a campus with room-and floor-level accuracy.

In 2015, all the indoor positioning technologies were moved to Accuware, Inc, which later developed additional technologies using Bluetooth and Computer vision for people and assets tracking.
