= Comparison of packet analyzers =

The following tables compare general and technical information for several packet analyzer software utilities, also known as network analyzers or packet sniffers. Please see the individual products' articles for further information.

== General information ==
Basic general information about the software—creator/company, license/price, etc.

	Creator	Latest release	User interface	Software license	Cost
Allegro Network Multimeter	Allegro Packets	July 20, 2023 / v4.0.4	web GUI	Proprietary	Non-free, price on request, depending on device and extensions
Cain and Abel	Massimiliano Montoro	April 7, 2014 / 4.9.56	GUI	Freeware	Free
Capsa	Colasoft	April 24, 2018 / 11.1	GUI	Proprietary	$0–$995, depending on version
Carnivore	Federal Bureau of Investigation	?	?	N/A	?
Charles Web Debugging Proxy	Karl van Randow	July 10, 2017 / 4.1.4	GUI	?	$30–$50 (Free Trial)
Clarified Analyzer	Clarified Networks		GUI	Proprietary	Non-free
Clusterpoint Network Traffic Surveillance System	Clusterpoint		web GUI	Proprietary	?
CommView	TamoSoft	November 30, 2017 / 6.5 Build 770	GUI	Proprietary	$299–$599, $149 1 year subscription
dSniff	Dug Song	December 17, 2000 / 2.3	CLI	BSD License	Free
EtherApe	Juan Toledo	June 3, 2018 / 0.9.18	GUI	GNU General Public License	Free
Ettercap	ALoR and NaGA	August 1, 2020 / 0.8.3.1-Bertillon	Both	GNU General Public License	Free
Fiddler	Eric Lawrence / Telerik	October 3, 2019 / 5.0.20194	GUI	Freeware	Free
justniffer	The Justniffer team	March 21, 2016 / 0.5.15	CLI	GNU General Public License	Free
Kismet	Mike Kershaw (dragorn)	May 2, 2020 / 2020-04-R3	CLI	GNU General Public License	Free
Microsoft Message Analyzer	Microsoft	October 28, 2016 / 1.4	GUI	Proprietary	Free
Microsoft Network Monitor	Microsoft	June 24, 2010 / 3.4	GUI	Proprietary	Free
netsniff-ng	Daniel Borkmann	November 7, 2016 / 0.6.2	CLI	GNU General Public License	Free
ngrep	Jordan Ritter	September 7, 2017 / 1.47	CLI	BSD-style	Free
Observer	Viavi Solutions (formerly Network Instruments)		GUI	Proprietary	Price on request
OmniPeek (formerly AiroPeek, EtherPeek)	LiveAction (formerly Savvius, WildPackets)	November 2017 / 11.1	GUI	Proprietary	$1194–$5994, depending on version
Sniffer	Netscout (formerly Network General)	2013	GUI	Proprietary	Non-free
SteelCentral Transaction Analyzer	OPNET Technologies/Riverbed Technology	June 9, 2014 / 17.0.T-PL1	GUI	Proprietary	Non-free
snoop	Sun Microsystems	December 11, 2006 / Solaris 10	CLI	CDDL	Free
tcpdump	The Tcpdump team	April 7, 2023 / 4.99.4	CLI	BSD License	Free
Wireshark (formerly Ethereal)	The Wireshark team	November 22, 2021 / 4.0.6	Both	GNU General Public License	Free
Xplico	The Xplico team	May 2, 2019 / 1.2.2	Both	GNU General Public License	Free

== Operating system support ==
The utilities can run on these operating systems.

Client	Microsoft Windows	macOS	Linux	BSDs	Solaris	Other
Cain and Abel	Yes	No	No	No	No	No
Capsa Free Edition	Yes	No	No	No	No	No
Carnivore	Yes	No	No	No	No	No
Charles Web Debugging Proxy	Yes	Yes	Yes	?	?	?
CommView	Yes	No	No	No	No	No
dSniff	?	Yes	Yes	Yes	Yes	?
EtherApe	No	Yes	Yes	Yes	Yes	?
Ettercap	Yes	Yes	Yes	Yes	Yes	?
justniffer	No	Yes	Yes	Yes	Yes	?
Kismet	Yes	Yes	Yes	Yes	?	?
Lanmeter	No	No	No	No	No	Fluke proprietary hardware
netsniff-ng	No	No	Yes	No	No	No
ngrep	Yes	Yes	Yes	Yes	Yes	AIX, BeOS, HP-UX, IRIX, Tru64 UNIX
Microsoft Network Monitor	Yes	No	No	No	No	No
OmniPeek (formerly AiroPeek, EtherPeek)	Yes	No	No	No	No	No
snoop	No	No	No	No	Yes	No
tcpdump	Yes (WinDump)	Yes	Yes	Yes	Yes	AIX, HP-UX, IRIX, Tru64 UNIX
Wireshark (formerly Ethereal)	Yes	Yes	Yes	Yes	Yes	AIX, HP-UX, IRIX, Tru64 UNIX
Xplico	No	No	Yes	No	No	No
