= Justniffer =

Packet sniffer

justniffer
- Developer: Justniffer Team
- Stable release: 0.6.12 / August 25, 2025; 8 months ago
- Operating system: Unix-like
- Type: Packet sniffer
- License: GPL
- Website: onotelli.github.io/justniffer/

Justniffer is a TCP packet sniffer. It can log network traffic in a 'standard' (web server-like) or in a customized way. It can also log response times, useful for tracking network services performances (e.g. web server, application server, etc.). The output format of the traffic can be easily customized. An example written in Python (delivered with the official package) stores the transferred contents in an output directory separated by domains. This means that the transferred files like html, css, javascript, images, sounds, etc. can be saved to a directory.

== Overview ==
justniffer was born to help in troubleshooting performance in network TCP-based services: HTTP, RTSP, SIP, SMTP, IMAP, POP, LDAP, Telnet etc.

It can collect low and high level protocol and performance information, reconstructing the TCP flow in a reliable way using portions of the Linux kernel code. It uses a slightly modified version of the libnids libraries that already include a modified version of Linux kernel code in a more reusable way. It can be extended with external scripts (bash, Python, or any executable) and generate logs in a customizable way

The man page for justniffer explains all the options.

== See also ==
- Comparison of packet analyzers
- tcpdump, a packet analyzer
- pcap, an application programming interface (API) for capturing network traffic
- snoop, a command line packet analyzer included with Solaris
- wireshark, a network packet analyzer
- dsniff, a packet sniffer and set of traffic analysis tools
- netsniff-ng, a free Linux networking toolkit
- ngrep, a tool that can match regular expressions within the network packet payloads
- etherape, a network mapping tool that relies on sniffing traffic
- tcptrace, a tool for analyzing the logs produced by tcpdump
- Microsoft Network Monitor, a packet analyzer
