= Arpon =

Arpon may refer to:

- ArpON, a computer software project
- María Elena Arpón (born 1948), Spanish actress
- Óscar Arpón (born 1975), Spanish former footballer
- Rodolfo Arpon (born 1944), Filipino boxer
