= NetSpot =

Software tool for wireless network assessment

- Developer: Etwok Inc.
- Initial release: August 2011; 14 years ago (Mac OS X); February 2016; 10 years ago (Windows)
- Stable release: 5.1.4971 (macOS) August 2025; 7 months ago 5.1.0.707 (Windows) August 2025; 7 months ago
- Written in: Objective-C
- Operating system: Mac OS X 10.6+, Windows 7 and later, Android OS 8.0+, iOS 15.5+
- Platform: x86
- Available in: English, French, German, Portuguese, Spanish, Japanese, Russian
- Type: Wireless site survey
- License: free, or paid
- Website: www.netspotapp.com

NetSpot is a software tool for wireless network assessment, scanning, and surveys, analyzing Wi-Fi coverage and performance. It runs on Mac OS X 10.6+ and Windows 7, 8, 10, and 11. Netspot supports IEEE 802.11be, IEEE 802.11ax, IEEE 802.11ac, IEEE 802.11n, IEEE 802.11a, IEEE 802.11b, and IEEE 802.11g wireless networks and uses the standard Wi-Fi network adapter and its Airport interface to map radio signal strength and other wireless network parameters, and build reports on that. NetSpot was released in August 2011.

== Functions ==
NetSpot provides all professional wireless site survey features for Wi-Fi and maps coverage of a living area, office space, buildings, etc. It provides visual data to help analyze radio signal leaks, discover noise sources, map channel use, optimize access point locations. The application can also perform Wi-Fi network planning: the data that are collected help to select channels and placements for new hotspots. Survey reports can be generated in PDF format.

== Usual uses ==
- Mapping Wi-Fi
- Mapping Wi-Fi signal strength
- Optimizing networks
- Trouble-shooting networks
- Visualizing wireless networks
- Diagnosing signal problems
- Analyzing wireless network coverage

== See also ==
- iStumbler – an open-source utility to find wireless networks and devices in Mac OS X
- KisMAC – a wireless network discovery tool for Mac OS X
- WiFi Explorer – a wireless network scanner for Mac OS X
