= RCPI =

RCPI may refer to:

- Received Channel Power Indicator
- Revolutionary Communist Party of India
- Royal College of Physicians of Ireland
