= SkyGrabber =

- Developer: SkySoftware incl. Andrew Solonikov
- Stable release: 3.2 / December 28, 2013; 12 years ago
- Operating system: Microsoft Windows
- Available in: English & Russian
- Type: Computer surveillance/Packet analyzer
- License: Shareware

SkyGrabber is a software from the Russian company SkySoftware which accepts input from a digital satellite tuner card for hard drive recording.

== History ==
It was used by Iraqi insurgents from the group Kata'ib Hezbollah to intercept MQ-1 Predator drone video feeds, which were not encrypted. The encryption for the feeds was removed for performance reasons.

== See also ==
- Comparison of packet analyzers
- Satellite Internet access
