= Ettercap =

Ettercap may refer to:

- Ettercap (Dungeons & Dragons), a fictional monster
- Ettercap (software), a network security tool

== See also ==
- EtherCAT
