= Received signal strength indicator =

Measurement of the power in a radio signal

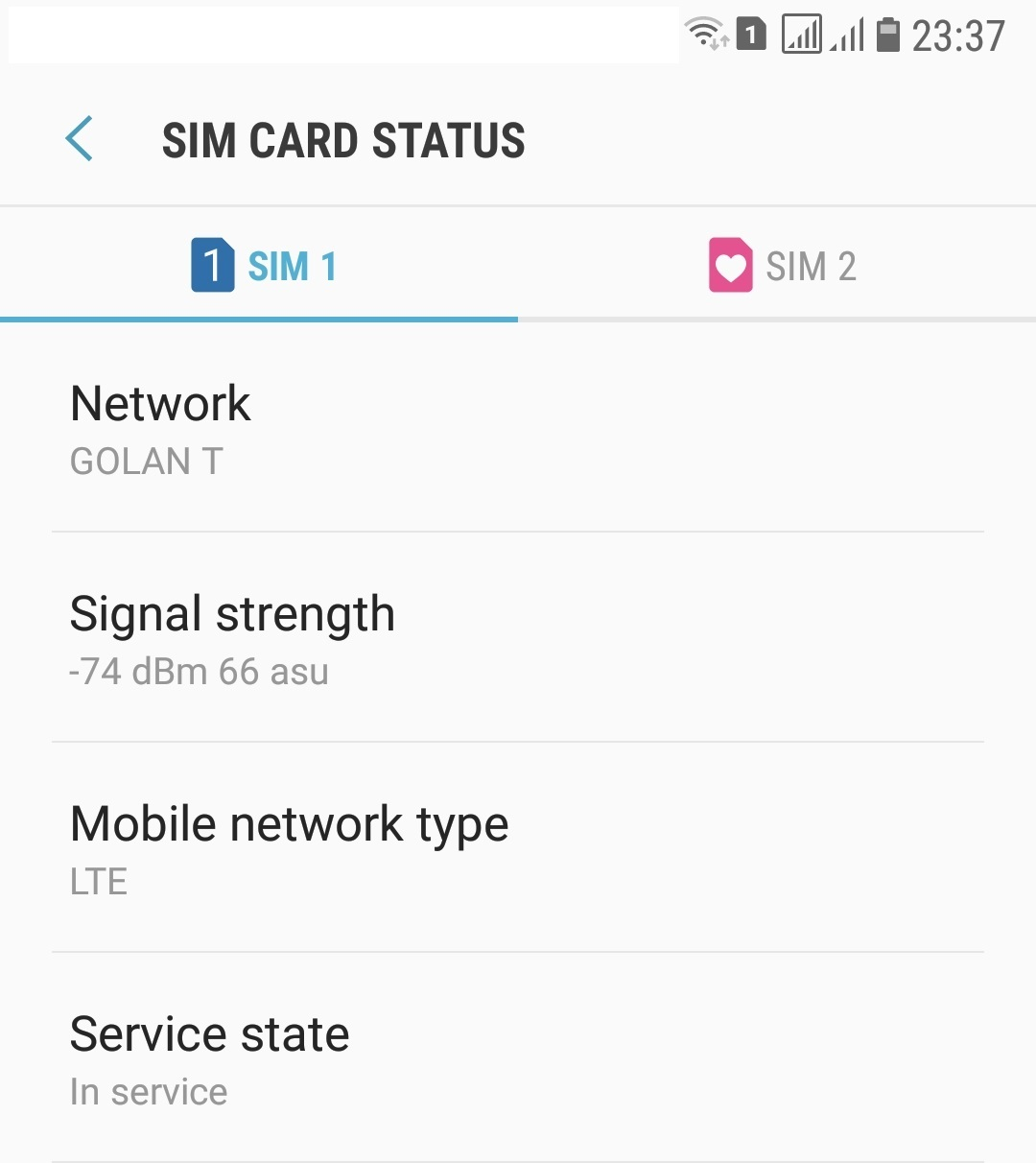
Cellular signal strength of -74dBm (or 66 asu) displayed on a smartphone. Also shown: signal bars of two cellular networks, and signal bars of a Wi-Fi network.

In telecommunications, received signal strength indicator or received signal strength indication (RSSI) is a measurement of the power present in a received radio signal.

RSSI is usually invisible to a user of a receiving device. However, because signal strength can vary greatly and affect functionality in wireless networking, IEEE 802.11 devices often make the measurement available to users.

RSSI is often derived in the intermediate frequency (IF) stage before the IF amplifier. In zero-IF systems, it is derived in the baseband signal chain, before the baseband amplifier. RSSI output is often a DC analog level. It can also be sampled by an internal analog-to-digital converter (ADC) and the resulting values made available directly or via peripheral or internal processor bus.

== In 802.11 implementations ==
In an IEEE 802.11 system, RSSI is the relative received signal strength in a Wireless environment, in arbitrary units. RSSI is an indication of the power level being received by the receiving radio after the antenna and possible cable loss. Therefore, the greater the RSSI value, the stronger the signal. Thus, when an RSSI value is represented in a negative form (e.g. −100), the closer the value is to 0, the stronger the received signal has been.

RSSI can be used internally in a wireless networking card to determine when the amount of radio energy in the channel is below a certain threshold at which point the network card is clear to send (CTS). Once the card is clear to send, a packet of information can be sent. The end-user will likely observe an RSSI value when measuring the signal strength of a wireless network through the use of a wireless network monitoring tool like Wireshark, Kismet or Inssider. As an example, Cisco Systems cards have an RSSI maximum value of 100 and will report 101 different power levels, where the RSSI value is 0 to 100. Another popular Wi-Fi chipset is made by Atheros. An Atheros-based card will return an RSSI value of 0 to 127 (0x7f) with 128 (0x80) indicating an invalid value.

There is no standardized relationship of any particular physical parameter to the RSSI reading. The 802.11 standard does not define any relationship between RSSI value and power level in milliwatts or decibels referenced to one milliwatt (dBm). Vendors and chipset makers provide their own accuracy, granularity, and range for the actual power (measured as milliwatts, which can be expressed in terms of decibels relative to one milliwatt) and their range of RSSI values (from 0 to RSSI maximum, in arbitrary signal units "asu"). One subtlety of the 802.11 RSSI metric comes from how it is sampled—RSSI is acquired during only the preamble stage of receiving an 802.11 frame, not over the full frame.

As early as 2000, researchers were able to use RSSI for coarse-grained location estimates. More recent work was able to reproduce these results using more advanced techniques. Nevertheless, RSSI does not always provide measurements that are sufficiently accurate to properly determine the location. However, RSSI still represents the most feasible indicator for localization purposes as it is available in almost all wireless nodes and it does not have any additional hardware requirements.

=== Received channel power indicator ===
For the most part, 802.11 RSSI has been replaced with received channel power indicator (RCPI). RCPI is an 802.11 measure of the received radio frequency power in a selected channel over the preamble and the entire received frame, and has defined absolute levels of accuracy and resolution. RCPI is exclusively associated with 802.11 and as such has some accuracy and resolution enforced on it through IEEE 802.11k-2008. Received signal power level assessment is a necessary step in establishing a link for communication between wireless nodes. However, a power level metric like RCPI generally cannot comment on the quality of the link like other metrics such as travel time measurement (time of arrival).

== Uses in indoor localization ==
=== RSSI-based distance estimation ===
RSSI is commonly used in wireless communication protocols, such as Bluetooth and ZigBee, to estimate the distance between nodes. This estimation is essential for indoor localization and is often preferred due to its simplicity and the lack of need for synchronization or timestamping, as required in other methods like Time of Arrival (TOA).

=== Localization algorithms ===
Various localization algorithms, such as anchor-based algorithms, employ RSSI. Anchor-based algorithms use nodes with known positions (anchors) to determine the location of an unknown node. The accuracy of these algorithms is enhanced by using a higher number of known nodes, as they rely on the Time of Arrival (TOA) and Angle of Arrival (AOA) of the signal for estimating the distance between the known nodes and the unknown node. However, the accuracy of these algorithms can be affected by environmental factors, such as signal interference, obstacles, and the density of nodes in the area.

=== Effect of environmental factors and antenna type ===
Factors like diffraction, reflection, scattering, and antenna type can significantly influence RSSI values. These variables need consideration for accurate indoor localization using RSSI.

=== RSSI-with-Angle-based Localization Estimation (RALE) ===
The RALE approach offers several advantages for indoor localization:

- Does not require complex infrastructure or prior scene surveys.
- Low cost and simple execution, making it accessible for various applications.
- Only requires RSSI values and angular measurements, eliminating the need for more sophisticated measurements.

== See also ==
- Signal strength in telecommunications
- Log-distance path loss model
- Signal strength based Wi-Fi positioning system
- RSSI to dBm Calculator
