= TamoGraph Site Survey =

- Developer(s): TamoSoft
- Stable release: 8.2
- Operating system: Windows, macOS
- Type: Wireless site survey
- License: Proprietary EULA
- Website: www.tamos.com

TamoGraph Site Survey is an application for performing Wi-Fi site surveys and RF planning. It supports 802.11be, 802.11ax, 802.11ac, 802.11n, 802.11a, 802.11b, and 802.11g wireless networks. TamoGraph is developed by TamoSoft, a privately held New Zealand company founded in 1998 that specializes in network analysis software.

== Functionality ==
TamoGraph is used for measuring and visualizing such WLAN characteristics as signal strength, signal-to-noise ratio, signal-to-interference ratio, TCP and UDP throughput rates, access point vendor, encryption type, etc. Visualizations are overlaid on floor plans or, in case of outdoor surveys, on site maps that can be imported from one of the online map services. Data is collected by a portable computer using a compatible Wi-Fi adapter.

When performing planning of Wi-Fi networks, the tool can be used for creating a virtual model of a future network, where walls and other obstructions are drawn using different material types (drywall, glass, brick, etc.). The tool will then calculate the approximate locations of where the access points should be placed. At the post-deployment stage, TamoGraph is used to validate the deployed wireless network, as well as to measure interference from both Wi-Fi and non-Wi-Fi sources with the help of Wi-Spy or WiPry, USB-based spectrum analyzers.

== Features ==
- Passive, active and simultaneous passive/active survey modes.
- RF modeling.
- Automatic access point location
- Automatic virtual access point placement and capacity planning in predictive models.
- Detailed information about access points: channel, supported rates, encryption, etc.
- Support for outdoor surveys using GPS
- Spectrum analysis
- Customizable reporting in PDF, Microsoft Word, and HTML formats
