= Arptables =

Network administrator's tool

The arptables computer software utility is a network administrator's tool for maintaining the Address Resolution Protocol (ARP) packet filter rules in the Linux kernel firewall modules.

The tools may be used to create, update, and view the tables that contain the filtering rules, similarly to the iptables program from which it was developed. A popular application is the creation of filter configurations to prevent ARP spoofing.

Linux kernel 2.4 only offers two ARP filtering chains, INPUT and OUTPUT, and Linux kernel 2.6 adds the third, FORWARD, applied when bridging packets.
