= P-mode =

P-mode can refer to:

- protected mode, an operation mode of x86 CPUs
- promiscuous mode, in computer networking
- pressure mode pulsation in asteroseismology
