= Arpwatch =

Computer networking software tool

arpwatch
- Original author: Craig Leres
- Developer: Lawrence Berkeley National Laboratory Network Research Group
- Release: v1.0 Tue Jun 16 3:05:31 PDT 1992
- Stable release: 3.9 / October 23, 2025; 10 months ago
- Written in: C
- Operating system: Cross-platform
- Available in: English
- Type: Computer security
- License: 3-clause BSD source with autoconf parts under GNU General Public License
- Website: ee.lbl.gov

arpwatch is a computer software tool for monitoring Address Resolution Protocol traffic on a computer network. It generates a log of observed pairing of IP addresses with MAC addresses along with a timestamp when the pairing appeared on the network. It also has the option of sending an email to an administrator when a pairing changes or is added.

Network administrators monitor ARP activity to detect ARP spoofing, network flip-flops, changed and new stations and address reuse.

arpwatch was developed by Lawrence Berkeley National Laboratory, Network Research Group, as open-source software and is released under the BSD license.

== See also ==
- ArpON
- arping
- Ettercap
