= Network detector =

Computer programs used to detect WLANs

Network detectors, or network discovery software, are computer programs that facilitate detection of wireless LANs using the 802.11b, 802.11a and 802.11g WLAN standards. Discovering networks may be done through active as well as passive scanning.

== Active scanning ==
Active scanning is done through sending multiple probe requests and recording the probe responses. The probe response received normally contains BSSID and WLAN SSID. If SSID broadcasting has been turned off, and active scanning is the only type of scanning supported by the software, no networks will show up. An example of an active scanner is NetStumbler.

== Passive scanning ==
Passive scanning is not done by active probing, but by mere listening to any data sent out by the AP. Once a legitimate user connects to the AP, the AP will eventually send out a SSID in cleartext. By impersonating this AP by automatic altering of the MAC address, the computer running the network discovery scanner will be given this SSID by legitimate users. Passive scanners include Kismet and essid jack (a program under AirJack).

== Notable programs ==
Notable programs include Network Stumbler, Kismet, Lumeta Corporation, Aerosol, AirMagnet, MacStumbler, Ministumbler, Mognet, NetChaser, perlskan, Wireless Security Auditor, Wlandump, PocketWarrior, pocketWinc, Prismstumbler, Sniff-em, AiroPeek, Airscanner, AP Scanner, AP Radar, Apsniff, BSD-Airtools, dstumbler, gtk-scanner, gWireless, iStumbler, KisMAC, Sniffer Wireless, THC-Scan, THC-Wardrive, WarGlue, WarKizniz, Wellenreiter, Wi-Scan and WiStumbler.
