= NetStumbler =

Network Stumbler
- Developer(s): Marius Milner
- Final release: 0.4.0 / April 2004
- Operating system: Windows 9x (with version 0.3.30), Windows 2000, Windows XP
- License: Donationware
- Website: www.stumbler.net

NetStumbler (also known as Network Stumbler) was a tool for Windows that facilitates detection of Wireless LANs using the 802.11b, 802.11a and 802.11g WLAN standards. It runs on Microsoft Windows operating systems from Windows 2000 to Windows XP. A trimmed-down version called MiniStumbler is available for the handheld Windows CE operating system.

Netstumbler has become one of the most popular programs for wardriving and wireless reconnaissance, although it has a disadvantage. It can be detected easily by most intrusion detection system, because it actively probes a network to collect information. Netstumbler has integrated support for a GPS unit. With this support, Netstumbler displays GPS coordinate information next to the information about each discovered network, which can be useful for finding specific networks again after having sorted out collected data.

The program is commonly used for:

- Verifying network configurations
- Finding locations with poor coverage in a WLAN
- Detecting causes of wireless interference
- Detecting unauthorized ("rogue") access points
- Aiming directional antennas for long-haul WLAN links

No updated version has been developed since 2004.

== See also ==
- InSSIDer was created as an alternative to Network Stumbler for the current generation of Windows operating system
- Kismet for Linux, FreeBSD, NetBSD, OpenBSD, and Mac OS X
- KisMAC for Mac OS X
