= ARP cache =

Collection of Address Resolution Protocol entries

An ARP cache is a collection of Address Resolution Protocol entries (mostly dynamic), that are created when an IP address is resolved to a MAC address (so the computer can effectively communicate with the IP address). The term can be used interchangeably with ARP table, although the latter is sometimes a distinct statically configured table.

An ARP cache has the disadvantage of potentially being used by hackers and cyberattackers (an ARP cache poisoning attack). An ARP cache helps the attackers hide behind a fake IP address. Beyond the fact that ARP caches may help attackers, it may also prevent the attacks by "distinguish[ing] between low level IP and IP based vulnerabilities".
