= IPTraf =

Computer program

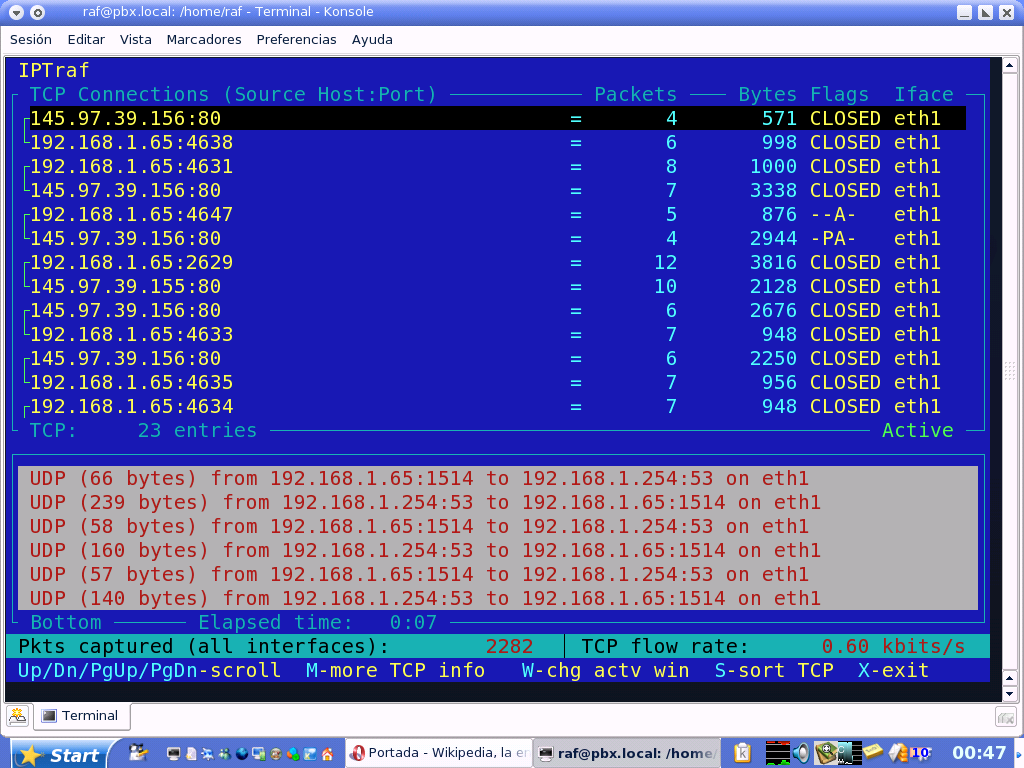
- Original author(s): Gerard Paul Java
- Final release: 3.0.0 / 19 September 2005; 19 years ago
- License: GPL, LGPL BSD
- Website: iptraf.seul.org

IPTraf-ng
- Developer(s): Nikola Pajkovsky, Phil Cameron, Vitezslav Samel
- Stable release: 1.2.2 / November 21, 2024; 8 months ago
- Website: github.com/iptraf-ng/iptraf-ng

IPTraf is a software - based console that provides network statistics. It works by collecting information from TCP connections, such as statistics and activity interfaces and drops TCP and UDP traffic. It is available in Linux operating systems.

== Features ==
In addition to a menu of options to full screen, IPTraf has the following characteristics:

- IP traffic monitor displays information about network traffic.
- General statistics Interfaces.
- LAN statistics module that discovers s host displays data about their activity.
- Monitor TCP, UDP account showing the network packets for port connections of applications.
- Use the "raw socket interface" that takes kernel allowing it to be used by a wide range of "network cards".

== Recognized protocols ==
IPTtraf supports multiple protocols:

- IP
- TCP
- UDP
- ICMP
- IGP
- IGMP
- IGRP
- OSPF
- ARP
- RARP

== Supported interfaces ==
IPTraf supports a wide range of network interfaces:

- Local loopback
- All Ethernet interfaces supported by Linux.
- All FDDI interfaces supported by Linux.
- SLIP
- Asynchronous PPP
- Synchronous PPP over ISDN
- ISDN with encapsulation Raw IP
- ISDN with encapsulation Cisco HDLC
- Parallel Line IP.

== Data structures ==
The main data structures using the various facilities of the program are in doubly linked list, which facilitates their movement. The maximum number of entries is limited only by available memory. Search operations in most of the facilities are carried out linearly, a fact that causes a mild but almost imperceptible impact. Because of the speed with which tends to increase the traffic monitor IPs, it use a hash table to perform searches more efficiently. (Search operations are carried out whenever the program needs to check if it is already listed the Ethernet or IP address or protocol or network port.

In addition, it has a folding mechanism links merely contains notes on old entries that are available for reuse. Every time a connection is restarted or completely closed, the ticket information is not released, but added an entry to the closed-list. By detecting a new connection, the list is checked and if it is not empty, the first entry in use that is available will be reused, then, clear the list-closed
