= OPNET =

Software company

OPNET Technologies, Inc.
- Type: Formerly Public Company, NASDAQ:OPNT
- Industry: Computer software, Computer hardware, Network and Application Management
- Founded: 1986
- Headquarters: Bethesda, Maryland, USA
- Key people: Marc A. Cohen, CEO & Chairman; Alain J. Cohen, CTO & President; Mel Wesley, CFO; Erika Durrington, SVP; Yev Gurevich, SVP; Todd Kaloudis, SVP; Joseph Lenz, SVP; PJ Malloy, SVP; Dennis McCoy, SVP; Alberto Morales, SVP; Carol Nakhuda, SVP; Pradeep Singh, SVP; Edward Sykes, SVP.
- Revenue: ▲US$ 173 million (FY-12)
- Net income: ▲US$ 18 million (FY-12)
- Number of employees: Approximately 700 (2012)
- Website: www.opnet.com

OPNET Technologies, Inc. was a software business that provided performance management for computer networks and applications.

The company was founded in 1986 and went public in 2000. In October 2012, OPNET was acquired by Riverbed Technology, for about $1 billion US dollars.

== Corporate history ==
"OPNET" was Alain Cohen's (co-founder, CTO & President) graduate project for a networking course while he was at MIT. OPNET stood for Optimized Network Engineering Tools. Alain, along with brother Marc (co-founder, CEO & Chairman) and classmate Steven Baraniuk, decided to commercialize the software. The company's first product was OPNET Modeler, a software tool for computer network modeling and simulation.

Since becoming a public company in August 2000, OPNET executed the following acquisitions:

- March 2001: NetMaker Division of Make Systems
- January 2002: WDM NetDesign B.V.B.A
- October 2004: Altaworks Corporation
- October 2007: substantially all of the assets of Network Physics, Inc.
- August 2010: DSAuditor product line from Embarcadero Technologies
- May 2012: Clarus Systems, Inc.

As an independent company, OPNET grew profitably throughout its history. SEC filings are available with further information about its IPO, annual reports, and quarterly reports.

== OPNET Solutions (prior to acquisition by Riverbed) ==
- Application performance management, see AppTransaction Xpert in Comparison of packet analyzers
- Network performance management
- Network Simulator

== Product status ==
As of 2022, Riverbed discontinued sales of 'Riverbed Modeler', which was the new name for the former OPNET modeling software.
