= Kazakhstan man-in-the-middle attack =

State-actor security exploit by the government of Kazakhstan

In 2015, the government of Kazakhstan created a root certificate which could have enabled a man-in-the-middle attack on HTTPS traffic from Internet users in Kazakhstan. The government described it as a "national security certificate". If installed on users' devices, the certificate would have allowed the Kazakh government to intercept, decrypt, and re-encrypt any traffic passing through systems it controlled.

In July 2019, Kazakh ISPs started messaging their users that the certificate, now called the Qaznet Trust Certificate, issued by the state certificate authority the Qaznet Trust Network, would now have to be installed by all users.

Sites operated by Google, Facebook and Twitter appeared to be among the Kazakh government's initial targets.

On August 21, 2019, Mozilla and Google simultaneously announced that their Firefox and Chrome web browsers would not accept the government-issued certificate, even if installed manually by users. Apple also announced that they would make similar changes to their Safari browser. As of August 2019, Microsoft has so far not made any changes to its browsers, but reiterated that the government-issued certificate was not in the trusted root store of any of its browsers, and would not have any effect unless a user manually installed it.

In December 2020, the Kazakh government attempted to re-introduce the government-issued root certificate for a third time. In response to this, browser vendors again announced that they would block any such attempt by invalidating the certificate in their browsers.
