= WiFi Explorer =

Wireless network scanner tool for macOS

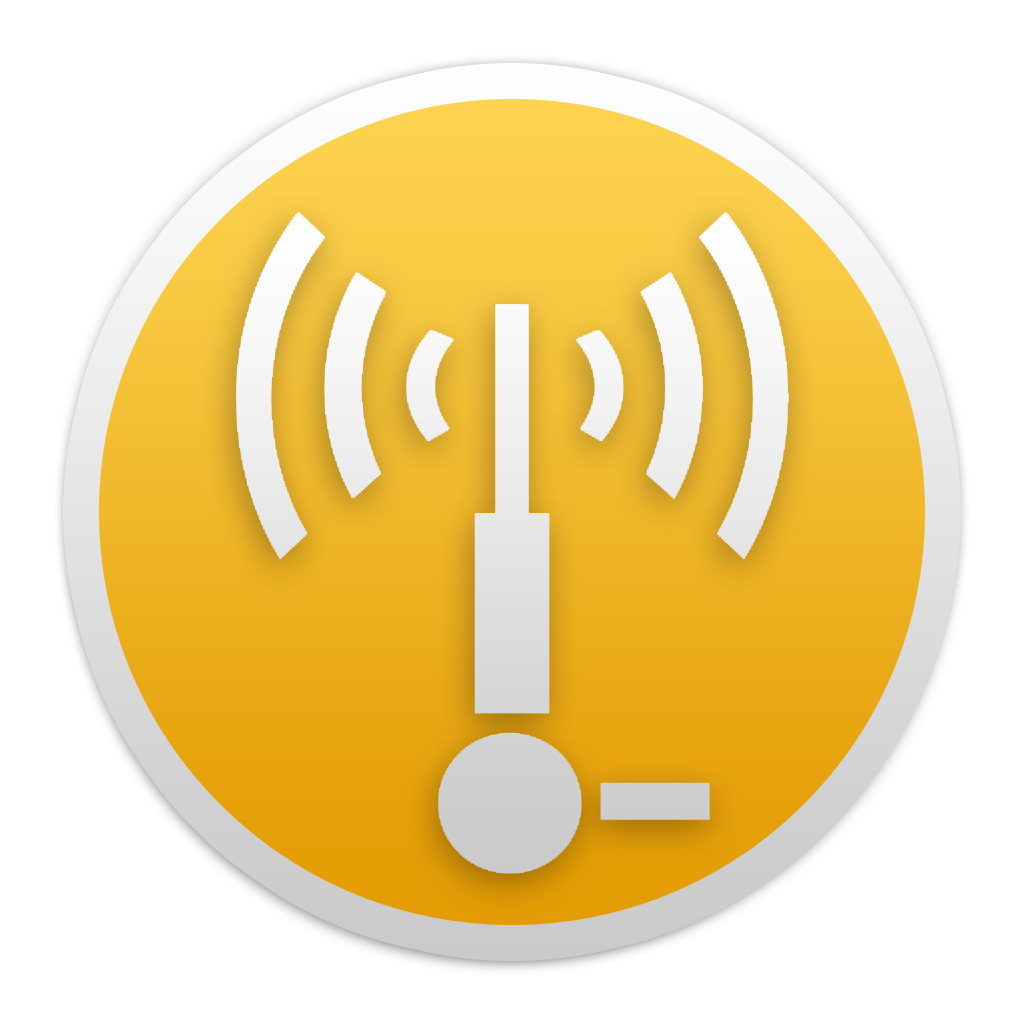

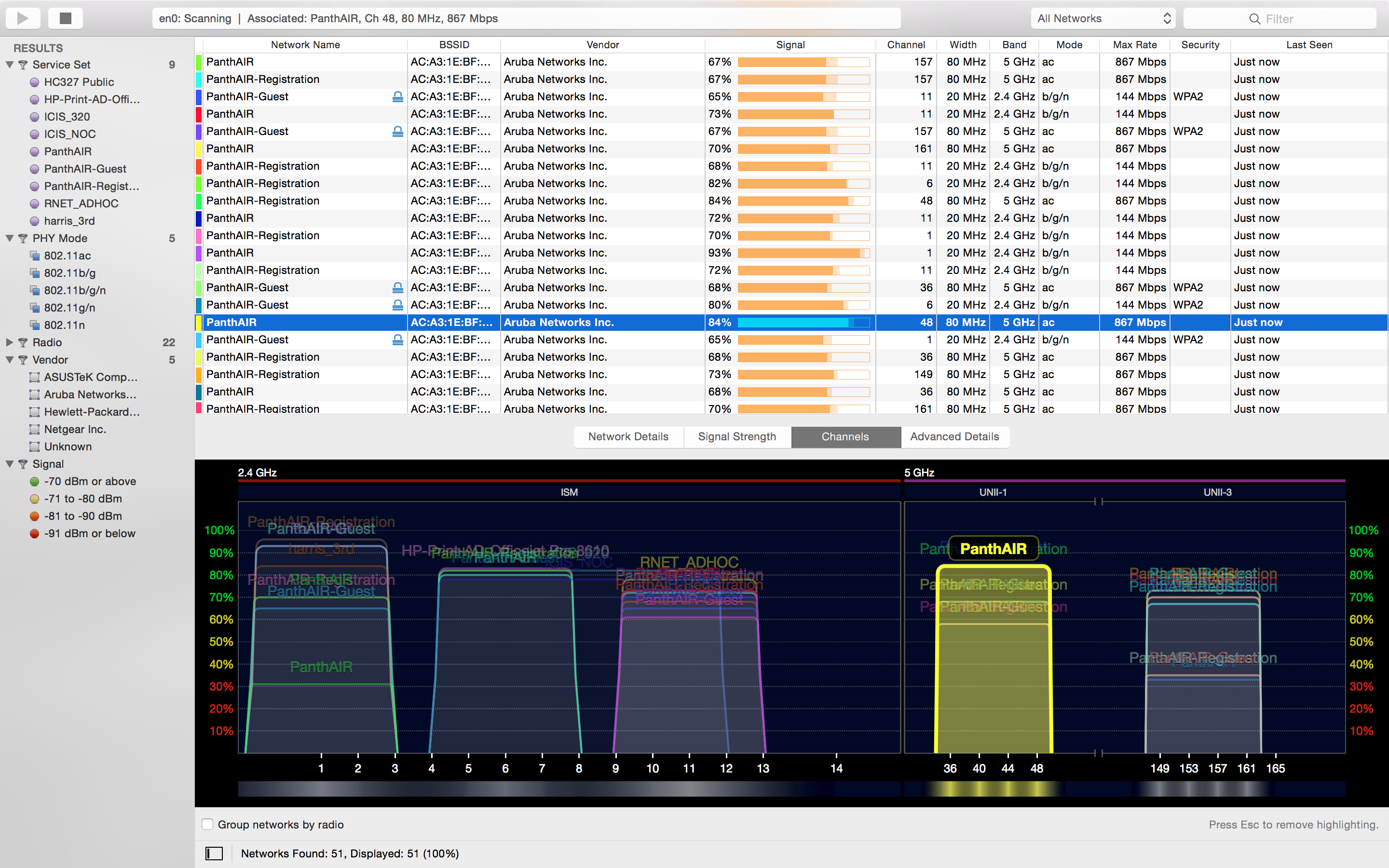
- WiFi Explorer, version 2.0 running on macOS 10.10.3
- Developer: Adrian Granados
- Release: January 17, 2012; 14 years ago
- Stable release: 3.6.5 / March 20, 2026; 7 months ago
- Written in: Objective-C
- Operating system: macOS
- Available in: English, French, Italian, Portuguese, Spanish
- Type: Wi-Fi network scanner
- License: Proprietary commercial software
- Website: www.intuitibits.com/products/wifi-explorer/

WiFi Explorer is a wireless network scanner tool for macOS that can help users identify channel conflicts, overlapping and network configuration issues that may be affecting the connectivity and performance of Wi-Fi networks.

== History ==
WiFi Explorer began as a desktop alternative to WiFi Analyzer, an iPhone app for wireless network scanning that was pulled out from Apple's App Store in March, 2010, due to the use of private frameworks. Since its first release, WiFi Explorer incorporated features that were not included in the last available version of WiFi Analyzer, such as support for 5 GHz networks and 40 MHz channel widths. Starting in version 1.5, WiFi Explorer included support for 802.11ac networks, as well as 80 and 160 MHz channel widths. On June 22, 2017, a professional version of WiFi Explorer, WiFi Explorer Pro, was released. WiFi Explorer Pro offers additional features especially designed for WLAN and IT professionals. The standard version of WiFi Explorer is also available on Setapp.

== Features ==
=== Standard ===
- Displays various network parameters:
  - Network name (SSID) and MAC address (BSSID)
  - Manufacturer
  - AP name for certain Cisco and Aruba devices
  - Beacon interval
  - Mode (802.11a/b/g/n/ac)
  - Band (2.4 GHz ISM and 5 GHz UNII-1, 2, 2 Extended, and 3)
  - Channel width (20, 40, 80, and 160 MHz)
  - Secondary channel offset
  - Security mode (WEP, WPA, WPA2)
  - Support for Wi-Fi Protected Setup (WPS)
  - Supported basic, min and max data rates
  - Advertised 802.11 Information Elements
- Graphical visualization of channel allocation, signal strength or Signal-to-noise ratio (SNR)
- Different sorting and filtering options
- Displays signal strength and noise values as percentage or dBm
- Ability to save and load results for later analysis
- Metrics and network details can be exported to a CSV file format
- Selectable and sortable columns
- Adjustable graph timescales
- Editable column for annotations, comments, etc.
- Customizable network colors
- Full screen mode
- Comprehensive application's help

=== Professional ===
- Passive and directed scan modes
- Spectrum analysis integration
- Apple's iOS AirPort Utility integration
- Enhanced filtering
- Support for remote sensors
- Support for networks with hidden SSIDs
- Support for external USB Wi-Fi adapters via the External Adapter Support Environment (EASE)
- Additional organization options for scan results
- Dark and light themes

== Limitations ==
Due to limitations of Apple's CoreWLAN framework, the standard version of WiFi Explorer is unable to detect hidden networks (except when connected to it) and does not support external USB Wi-Fi adapters. The Pro edition supports passive scanning, which can detect hidden networks, and can make use of external adapters via the External Adapter Support Environment (EASE).

== System requirements ==
- macOS 10.10 or higher (64-bit)

== See also ==
- iStumbler - An open-source utility for finding wireless networks and devices in macOS.
- KisMAC - A wireless network discovery tool for macOS.
- Netspot - A macOS tool for wireless networks assessment, scanning and surveys.
