= Arping =

Software utility for discovery of hosts on a computer network

In computing, arping is a software utility for discovering hosts on a computer network by sending link layer frames using Address Resolution Protocol (ARP) requests addressed to a host identified by its MAC address. The utility may use ARP to resolve an IP address provided by the user.

The utility is similar to ping which operates at a higher network layer – probing the network at the Internet Layer via the Internet Control Message Protocol (ICMP).

Two popular variants exist. One is part of Linux iputils suite, and cannot resolve MAC addresses to IP addresses. The other, written by Thomas Habets, can ping hosts by MAC address as well as by IP address, and adds more features.

In networks employing repeaters that implement proxy ARP, the ARP response may originate from such proxy hosts and not directly from the probed target.

== Example ==
Example output from iputils arping:

ARPING 192.168.39.120 from 192.168.39.1 eth0
Unicast reply from 192.168.39.120 [00:01:80:38:F7:4C]  0.810ms
Unicast reply from 192.168.39.120 [00:01:80:38:F7:4C]  0.607ms
Unicast reply from 192.168.39.120 [00:01:80:38:F7:4C]  0.602ms
Unicast reply from 192.168.39.120 [00:01:80:38:F7:4C]  0.606ms
Sent 4 probes (1 broadcast(s))
Received 4 response(s)

Example output from Thomas Habets's arping:

ARPING 192.168.16.96
60 bytes from 00:04:5a:4b:b6:ec (192.168.16.96): index=0 time=292.000 usec
60 bytes from 00:04:5a:4b:b6:ec (192.168.16.96): index=1 time=310.000 usec
60 bytes from 00:04:5a:4b:b6:ec (192.168.16.96): index=2 time=256.000 usec
^C
--- 192.168.16.96 statistics ---
3 packets transmitted, 3 packets received,   0% unanswered (0 extra)

== See also ==
- ArpON
- arpwatch
