= InSSIDer =

Wi-Fi network scanner application

inSSIDer
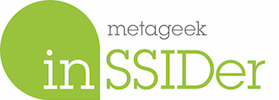
- Developers: MetaGeek, LLC
- Stable release: 5.6.1 / January 2026; 1 month ago
- Written in: C
- Operating system: Microsoft Windows 7 or higher, OS X Snow Leopard or higher (via Mac App Store)
- Platform: .NET Framework
- Size: 5.5 MB (.msi)
- Available in: English (US)
- Type: WiFi network analyzer
- License: 4.x: Shareware; 3.x: Proprietary; 2.x: Apache License
- Website: www.metageek.com/products/inssider/

inSSIDer is a Wi-Fi network scanner application for Microsoft Windows and OS X developed by MetaGeek, LLC. It has received awards such as a 2008 Infoworld Bossie Award for "Best of Open Source Software in Networking", but as of inSSIDer 3, it is no longer open-source.

== History ==
inSSIDer began as a replacement for NetStumbler, a popular Windows Wi-Fi scanner, which had not been actively developed for several years and reputedly did not work with modern 64-bit operating systems or versions of Windows higher than Windows XP. The project was inspired by Charles Putney on The Code Project.

== Features ==
- New in Version 5.0: channel utilization break down to show device (AP and client) airtime utilization; see connected client devices and info about client such as utilization and signal strength
- Gathers information from wireless card and software
- Helps choose the best wireless channel available
- Wi-Fi network information such as SSID, MAC, vendor, data rate, signal strength, and security
- Graphs signal strength over time
- Shows which Wi-Fi network channels overlap

== System requirements ==
=== Windows ===
- Version 5.0: Microsoft Windows 7 or higher
- Version 3.0: Microsoft Windows XP SP3 or higher
- Version 2.1: Microsoft Windows XP SP2
- Microsoft .NET Framework 3.5 or higher

=== OS X ===
- OS X Mountain Lion 10.8 or higher
