= Snoop (software) =

Packet analyser

snoop
- Developer: Sun Microsystems
- Stable release: Solaris 10 / December 11, 2006
- Operating system: Solaris
- Type: Packet analyzer
- License: CDDL
- Website: sun.com/solaris

Snoop software is a command line packet analyzer included in the Solaris Operating System created by Sun Microsystems. Its source code was available via the OpenSolaris project.

== See also ==
- Comparison of packet analyzers
- Network tap
