= CommView =

Network software application

CommView / CommView for WiFi
- Developer: TamoSoft
- Stable release: 7.0
- Operating system: Windows
- Type: Packet analyzer
- License: Proprietary EULA
- Website: www.tamos.com

CommView is an application for network monitoring, packet analysis, and decoding. There are two editions of CommView: the standard edition for Ethernet networks and the wireless edition for 802.11 networks named CommView for WiFi. The application runs on Microsoft Windows. It is developed by TamoSoft, a privately held New Zealand company founded in 1998.

== Functionality ==
CommView puts the network adapter into promiscuous mode and captures network traffic. It also supports capturing packets from dial-up and virtual adapters (e.g. ADSL or 3G modems), as well as capturing loopback traffic. Captured traffic is then analyzed and the application displays network statistics and individual packets. Packets are decoded using a protocol decoder. CommView for WiFi puts Wi-Fi adapters into monitor mode, providing the functionality and user experience similar to that of CommView, with the addition of WLAN-specific features, such as displaying and decoding of management and control frames, indication of signal and noise level, and per-node and per-channel statistics.

== Features ==
- Protocols distribution, bandwidth utilization, and network nodes charts and tables.
- Detailed IP connections statistics: IP addresses, ports, sessions, etc.
- VoIP analysis: H.323 and SIP
- WEP and WPA2-PSK decryption (wireless edition only)
- Multi-channel capturing using several USB adapters (wireless edition only)
- Packet injection using a packet generator
- User-defined packet filters and alarms
- TCP and UDP stream reconstruction
- Packet-to-application mapping
- Reporting
- Capture log file import and export
