= Packet analyzer =

Computer network equipment or software that analyzes network traffic

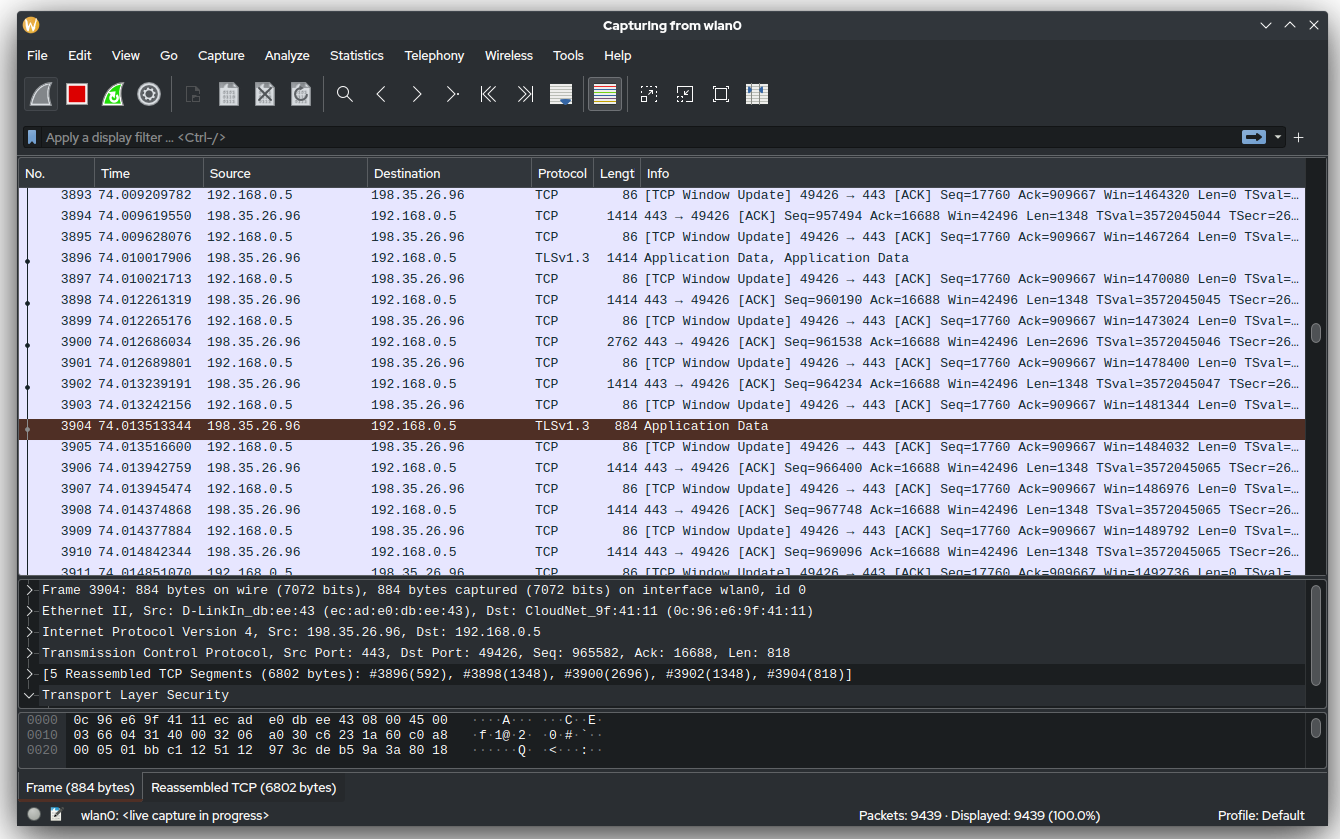
Screenshot of Wireshark network protocol analyzer

A packet analyzer (also packet sniffer or network analyzer) is a computer program or computer hardware such as a packet capture appliance that can analyze and log traffic that passes over a computer network or part of a network. Packet capture is the process of intercepting and logging traffic. As data streams flow across the network, the analyzer captures each packet and, if needed, decodes the packet's raw data, showing the values of various fields in the packet, and analyzes its content according to the appropriate RFC or other specifications.

A packet analyzer used for intercepting traffic on wireless networks is known as a wireless analyzer—those designed specifically for Wi-Fi networks are Wi-Fi analyzers. (Note: The term Wi-Fi analyzer is also used to describe the instruments and software for wireless site surveys.) While a packet analyzer can also be referred to as a network analyzer or protocol analyzer, these terms can also have other meanings. The class of protocol analyzers can technically be a broader, more general class that includes packet analyzers and sniffers. However, the terms are frequently used interchangeably.

== Capabilities ==
On wired shared-medium networks, such as Ethernet, Token Ring, and FDDI, depending on the network structure (hub or switch), (Note: Some methods avoid traffic narrowing by switches to gain access to traffic from other systems on the network (e.g., ARP spoofing).) it may be possible to capture all traffic on the network from a single machine. On modern networks, traffic can be captured using a network switch using port mirroring, which mirrors all packets that pass through designated ports of the switch to another port, if the switch supports port mirroring. A network tap is an even more reliable solution than using a monitoring port since taps are less likely to drop packets during high traffic loads.

On wireless LANs, traffic can be captured on one channel at a time, or by using multiple adapters, on several channels simultaneously.

On wired broadcast and wireless LANs, to capture unicast traffic between other machines, the network adapter capturing the traffic must be in promiscuous mode. On wireless LANs, even if the adapter is in promiscuous mode, packets not for the service set the adapter is configured for are usually ignored. To see those packets, the adapter must be in monitor mode. No special provisions are required to capture multicast traffic to a multicast group the packet analyzer is already monitoring, or broadcast traffic.

When traffic is captured, either the entire contents of packets or just the headers are recorded. Recording just headers reduces storage requirements and avoids some privacy legal issues, yet often provides sufficient information to diagnose problems.

Captured information is decoded from raw digital form into a human-readable format that lets engineers review exchanged information. Packet analyzers vary in their abilities to display and analyze data.

Some packet analyzers can also generate traffic. These can act as protocol testers. Such testers generate protocol-correct traffic for functional testing, and may also have the ability to deliberately introduce errors to test the device under test's ability to handle errors.

Packet analyzers can also be hardware-based, either in probe format or, as is increasingly common, combined with a disk array. These devices record packets or packet headers to a disk array.

== Uses ==
Packet analyzers can:

- Analyze network problems
- Detect network intrusion attempts
- Detect network misuse by internal and external users
- Document regulatory compliance through logging all perimeter and endpoint traffic
- Gain information for effecting a network intrusion
- Identify data collection and sharing of software such as operating systems (for strengthening privacy, control and security)
- Aid in gathering information to isolate exploited systems
- Monitor WAN bandwidth utilization
- Monitor network usage (including internal and external users and systems)
- Monitor data in transit
- Monitor WAN and endpoint security status
- Gather and report network statistics
- Identify suspect content in network traffic
- Troubleshoot performance problems by monitoring network data from an application
- Serve as the primary data source for day-to-day network monitoring and management
- Spy on other network users and collect sensitive information such as login details or users' cookies (depending on any content encryption methods that may be in use)
- Reverse engineer proprietary protocols used over the network
- Debug client–server communication
- Debug network protocol implementations
- Verify adds, moves, and changes
- Verify internal control system effectiveness (firewalls, access control, Web filter, spam filter, proxy)

Packet capture can be used to fulfill a warrant from a law enforcement agency to wiretap all network traffic generated by an individual. Internet service providers and VoIP providers in the United States must comply with Communications Assistance for Law Enforcement Act regulations. Using packet capture and storage, telecommunications carriers can provide the legally required secure and separate access to targeted network traffic and can use the same device for internal security purposes. Collecting data from a carrier system without a warrant is illegal due to laws about interception. By using end-to-end encryption, communications can be kept confidential from telecommunication carriers and legal authorities.

== Notable packet analyzers ==
- Allegro Network Multimeter
- Capsa Network Analyzer
- Charles Web Debugging Proxy
- Carnivore (software)
- CommView
- dSniff
- EndaceProbe Packet Capture Platform
- ettercap
- Fiddler
- Kismet
- Lanmeter
- Microsoft Network Monitor
- NarusInsight
- NetScout Systems nGenius Infinistream
- ngrep, Network Grep
- OmniPeek, Omnipliance by Savvius
- SkyGrabber
- The Sniffer
- snoop
- tcpdump
- Observer Analyzer
- Wireshark (formerly known as Ethereal)
- Xplico Open source Network Forensic Analysis Tool

== See also ==
- Bus analyzer
- Logic analyzer
- Network detector
- pcap
- Signals intelligence
- Traffic generation model
