= IStumbler =

iStumbler
- Developer: Alf Watt
- Stable release: Release 103 / November 14, 2017; 8 years ago
- Operating system: OS X 10.2 to macOS 11
- License: Proprietary
- Website: istumbler.net

iStumbler is a utility for finding wireless networks and devices with AirPort or Bluetooth-enabled Macintosh computers.

== History ==
iStumbler was originally based on MacStumbler source code. Its early development focused on detection of open wireless (802.11) networks, but more recent versions support the detection of Bluetooth wireless devices and Bonjour network services.

Up to release 99, iStumbler was open-source under a BSD license. It was later changed to nagware, having a pop-up screen every 30 minutes but otherwise being fully functional. Current releases require a payment to use.

The app has been delisted from the Mac App Store by the developers due to it not functioning properly on macOS Monterey and above.

== Usage ==
iStumbler uses the AirPort card built into Macs. It automatically scans for Wi-Fi and WLAN networks, and can also detect Bluetooth, Bonjour, and other AirPort networks. The software shows a graph which displays the network name, the type of security, the vendor, the signal, the channel, and the MAC address of listed networks. A graph showing the history of signal strength can also be displayed. It can be used to join listed AirPort networks without configuration and to join Bluetooth networks as well. It uses GPS data to display the coordinates of the computer being used and nearby Wi-Fi points.

iStumbler works by sending out probe requests to all available access points and displaying the information received from those requests.

== See also ==
- KisMAC – a wireless network discovery tool for macOS.
- WiFi Explorer – a wireless network scanner for macOS.
- Netspot – A macOS tool for wireless networks assessment, scanning and surveys.
