= Lanmeter =

Tool for testing Token Ring and Ethernet networks

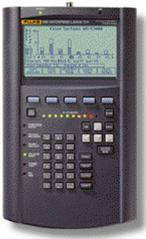
Fluke Model 675 Token Ring / Ethernet LANMeter

A LANMeter was a tool for testing Token Ring and Ethernet networks introduced by Fluke Corporation in 1993. It incorporated hardware testing (cable and network interface card) and active network testing in a handheld, battery operated package. It was discontinued in 2003.

== Variants ==
Name	Ethernet 10/100	Token Ring	Switch Wizard	Wide Area Wizard
FLUKE 670 Lanmeter	no	yes	?	?
FLUKE 672 Lanmeter	yes	no	?	?
FLUKE 675 Lanmeter	yes	yes	?	?
FLUKE 680 Enterprise Lanmeter	yes	no	?	?
FLUKE 682 Enterprise Lanmeter	yes	no	?	?
FLUKE 683 Enterprise Lanmeter	yes	no	?	?
FLUKE 685 Enterprise Lanmeter	yes	yes	?	?
FLUKE 686 Enterprise Lanmeter	yes	yes	?	?
