= OmniPeek =

Packet analyzer software tool

Omnipeek
- Developer: Savvius
- Stable release: 11.1 / November 7, 2017; 9 years ago
- Operating system: Windows
- Type: Packet analyzer
- Website: Official website

Omnipeek is a packet analyzer software tool from Savvius, a LiveAction company, for network troubleshooting and protocol analysis. It supports an application programming interface (API) for plugins.

== History ==
Savvius (formerly WildPackets) was founded in 1990 as The AG Group by Mahboud Zabetian and Tim McCreery. In 2000, the company changed its name to WildPackets to address the market it had developed for its products. The first product by the company was written for the Macintosh and was called EtherPeek. It was later ported to Microsoft Windows, which was released in 1997. Earlier, LocalPeek and TokenPeek were developed for LocalTalk and Token Ring networks, respectively. In 2001, AiroPeek was released, which added support for wireless IEEE 802.11 (marketed with the Wi-Fi brand) networks. In 2003, the OmniEngine Distributed Capture Engine was released as software and as a hardware network recorder appliance.

In the early morning of July 15, 2002, WildPackets' building in Walnut Creek, California burnt to the ground, including everything in it. No injuries were reported, and the company resumed operations at a new location.

Mid-April 2015, the company changed its name from WildPackets to Savvius and broadened its focus to include network security.

In June 2018, Savvius was acquired by LiveAction, a company that provides network performance management, visualization and analytics software.

== Acquisitions ==
Savvius acquired Net3 Group in November 2000. Their product, NetSense, an expert system for network troubleshooting, was converted initially converted into a plug-in and then later fully integrated into the product EtherPeekNX.

Savvius acquired Optimized Engineering Corporation in 2001. As a result, training courses, certifications, and instructors for network analysis were incorporated into the company’s services.

== Extensibility ==
Omnipeek has APIs on the front-end for automation, on the back-end for analysis, as well as other mechanisms to extend and enhance the program.

There are 40 plug-ins available for the Omnipeek Platform. These plug-ins range from logging extensions to full-blown applications that are hosted by OmniPeek.

Remote Adapters: provide a means to capture packets and stats. There are remote adapters to capture from RMON, NetFlow, SFlow, Cisco AP's, Aruba AP's, and Linux boxes. Adapters are available to aggregate packets from multiple network segments and wireless channels at the same time.

Protospecs and decoder files, which are interpreted text files, can be modified by users to support additional protocols and enhance existing protocol analysis. This process does not require releasing new versions of the application.

The plugin Wizards for the Omnipeek Console and the OmniEngine are Microsoft Visual Studio Project Templates that generate working plug-ins. When the wizard is run, a dialog appears providing options for types of functionality that sample code will be generated for. When the wizard is complete, the user is left with a working plugin with entry points for adding application logic.

The MyPeek Community Portal is an online resource for Omnipeek users and developers. It hosts plug-ins, scripts, adapters, tools, and documentation. Users can also share and access support resources for extending Omnipeek functionality.

PlaceMap: is a freely available standalone Google Maps Packet sniffer application for Windows that captures network traffic and maps nodes to the Google Map.

== Example plugins ==
- Google Map Plugin - map nodes to a Google Map
- SQLFilter Plugin - save and query packets from a database
- PeekPlayer Plugin - send packet an adapter or a capture window
- PowerBar Plugin - write scripts that process packets
- Decoder Plugin - decode packets
- WatchMe Plugin - display web sites in real-time from URLs
- Browser Plugin - construct and display web pages from packets
- IM Plugin - display instant message screen names and chat
- WebStats Plugin - collect and report web statistics
- Remote TCPDump Adapter Plugin - stream packets from any machine with SSH and tcpdump
- Cisco Remote Adapter Plugin - stream packets from Cisco access points
- Aruba Remote Adapter Plugin - stream packets from Aruba Networks air monitors
