= Capsa (software) =

Packet analyzer software

Capsa Network Analyzer
- Developer(s): Colasoft
- Stable release: 11.1 / 18 April 2018; 7 years ago
- Operating system: Microsoft Windows
- Type: Packet analyzer
- License: Freeware Shareware
- Website: www.colasoft.com/capsa/

Capsa is the name for a family of packet analyzers developed by Colasoft for network administrators to monitor, troubleshoot and analyze wired & wireless networks. The company provides a free edition for individuals, but paid licenses are available for businesses and enterprises. The software includes Ethernet packet analysis, diagnostics and a security monitoring system.
