= Wireless site survey =

Planning and designing a wireless network

A wireless site survey, sometimes called an RF (Radio Frequency) site survey or wireless survey, is the process of planning and designing a wireless network, to provide a wireless solution that will deliver the required wireless coverage, data rates, network capacity, roaming capability and quality of service (QoS). The survey usually involves a site visit to test for RF interference, and to identify optimum installation locations for access points. This requires analysis of building floor plans, inspection of the facility, and use of site survey tools. Interviews with IT management and the end users of the wireless network are also important to determine the design parameters for the wireless network.

As part of the wireless site survey, the effective range boundary is set, which defines the area over which signal levels needed support the intended application. This involves determining the minimum signal-to-noise ratio (SNR) needed to support performance requirements.

Wireless site survey can also mean the walk-testing, auditing, analysis or diagnosis of an existing wireless network, particularly one which is not providing the level of service required.

== Wireless site survey process ==
Wireless site surveys are typically conducted using computer software that collects and analyses WLAN metrics and/or RF spectrum characteristics. Before a survey, a floor plan or site map is imported into a site survey application and calibrated to set scale. During a survey, a surveyor walks the facility with a portable computer that continuously records the data. The surveyor either marks the current position on the floor plan manually, by clicking on the floor plan, or uses a GPS receiver that automatically marks the current position if the survey is conducted outdoors. After a survey, data analysis is performed and survey results are documented in site survey reports generated by the application. The data is often presented along with a wireless heat map based on the recorded metrics.

All these data collection, analysis, and visualization tasks are highly automated in modern software. In the past, however, these tasks required manual data recording and processing.

== Types of wireless site surveys ==
There are three main types of wireless site surveys: passive, active, and predictive.

During a passive survey, a site survey application passively listens to WLAN traffic to detect active access points, measure signal strength and noise level. However, the wireless adapter being used for a survey is not associated to any WLANs. For system design purposes, one or more temporary access points are deployed to identify and qualify access point locations. This used to be the most common method of pre-deployment Wi-Fi survey.

During an active survey, the wireless adapter is associated with one or several access points to measure round-trip time, throughput rates, packet loss, and retransmissions. Active surveys are used to troubleshoot Wi-Fi networks or to verify performance post-deployment.

During a predictive survey, a model of the RF environment is created using simulation tools. It is essential that the correct information on the environment is entered into the RF modeling tool, including location and RF characteristics of barriers like walls or large objects. Therefore, temporary access points or signal sources can be used to gather information on propagation in the environment. Virtual access points are then placed on the floor plan to estimate expected coverage and adjust their number and location. The value of a predictive survey as a design tool versus a passive survey done with only a few access point is that modeled interference can be taken into account in the design.

Additionally, some survey application allow the user to collect RF spectrum data using portable hardware spectrum analyzers, which is beneficial in case of high RF interference from non-802.11 sources, such as microwave ovens or cordless phones.

== Site survey software and hardware ==
Depending on the survey type, a number of software and software/hardware options are available to WLAN surveyors.

=== Software ===
Passive and active surveys are performed using software and typically require only a compatible off-the-shelf Wi-Fi adapter; no additional specialized hardware is required. Predictive surveys require no hardware at all, as no wireless data collection is needed. Currently, professional-level site survey applications exist primarily for Microsoft Windows. Some site survey applications for other platforms, including iOS and Android, also exist, however they are limited in functionality due to the limitations of the underlying platform API. For example, signal level measurements cannot be obtained on iOS without jailbreaking. The feasibility of creating professional-level applications for non-Windows tablets is debated.

=== Hardware ===
Unlike passive and active surveys, RF spectrum surveys require specialized RF equipment. There are various types of spectrum analyzers ranging from large and expensive bench-top units to portable ("field units") and USB-based analyzers. Because portability is a decisive factor in conducting wireless site surveys, spectrum analyzers in USB form factor are widely used today. They typically cover multiple bands; dual-band (2.4/5 GHz) and triple-band (2.4/5/6 GHz) models are available. A number of WLAN chipset manufacturers incorporate spectrum analysis into their chipset designs; this functionality is integrated into some high-end enterprise-class Wi-Fi access points.
