= Fiddler (software) =

Web debugging proxy

- Original author: Eric Lawrence
- Stable release: 6.0.20261 / 2.6.2.3 / 26 June 2026; 3 months ago
- License: Freeware / Shareware
- Website: www.fiddler2.com/docs
- Repository: github.com/telerik/fiddler-docs

Fiddler is a web debugging proxy and tool that logs all HTTP and HTTPS traffic between your device and the internet. It was created by Eric Lawrence in 2003 as a separate project when he was still working in Microsoft.

In September 2012, Telerik announced its acquisition of Fiddler and still maintained by Telerik as of present.

== Description ==
Fiddler is an application that creates a local proxy, monitoring all the data exchanged with another HTTP or HTTPS web service. This is a tool which does not encumber installed system and provide detailed logs, showing it is there any issue on the desktop-web service communication. It allows web traffic inspection, breakpoint setting, "fiddling" (modifying) incoming or outgoing data, and an event-based scripting subsystem extended using .NET language.

fiddler's other features include web session manipulation, web debugging and security testing for any networking related. Fiddler can debug traffic from virtually any application that supports a proxy, including Internet Explorer, Google Chrome, Apple Safari, Mozilla Firefox, Opera, and thousands more. You can also debug traffic from popular devices like Windows Phone, iPod/iPad, and others.
