= KisMAC =

Wireless network discovery tool for Mac OS X

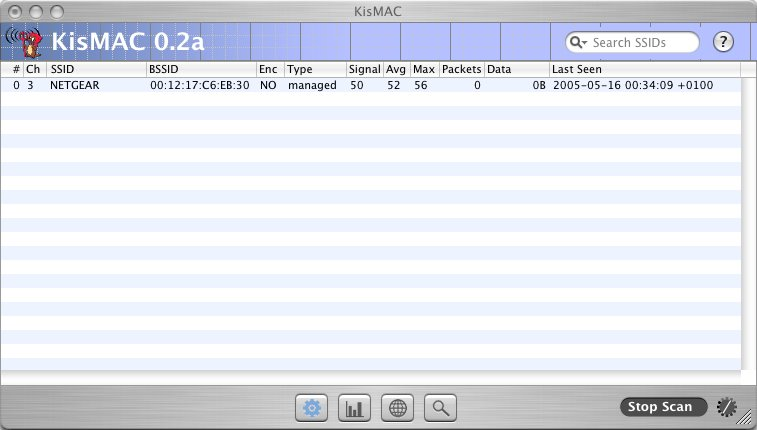
- KisMAC on Mac OS X
- Stable release: 0.3.4 (Alpha 4) / September 2015; 10 years ago
- Operating system: Mac OS X
- Type: Wi-Fi tool
- License: GPL
- Website: github.com/IGRSoft/KisMac2

KisMAC is a wireless network discovery tool for Mac OS X. It has a wide range of features, similar to those of Kismet (its Linux/BSD namesake). The program is geared toward network security professionals, and is not as novice-friendly as similar applications. Distributed under the GNU General Public License, KisMAC is free software.

KisMAC will scan for networks passively on supported cards - including Apple's AirPort, and AirPort Extreme, and many third-party cards, and actively on any card supported by Mac OS X itself.

Cracking of WEP and WPA keys, both by brute force, and exploiting flaws such as weak scheduling and badly generated keys is supported when a card capable of monitor mode is used, and packet reinjection can be done with a supported card (Prism2 and some Ralink cards). GPS mapping can be performed when an NMEA compatible GPS receiver is attached.

Kismac2 is a fork of the original software with a new GUI, new features and that works for OS X 10.7 - 10.10, 64-bit only. It is no longer maintained.

Data can also be saved in pcap format and loaded into programs such as Wireshark.

== KisMAC Features ==
- Reveals hidden / cloaked / closed SSIDs
- Shows logged in clients (with MAC Addresses, IP addresses and signal strengths)
- Mapping and GPS support
- Can draw area maps of network coverage
- PCAP import and export
- Support for 802.11b/g
- Different attacks against encrypted networks
- Deauthentication attacks
- AppleScript-able
- Kismet drone support (capture from a Kismet drone)

== KisMAC and Germany ==
The project was created and led by Michael Rossberg until July 27, 2007, when he removed himself from the project due to changes in German law (specifically, StGB Section 202c) that "prohibits the production and distribution of security software". On this date, project lead was passed on to Geoffrey Kruse, maintainer of KisMAC since 2003, and active developer since 2001. KisMAC is no longer being actively being developed. Primary development, and the relocated KisMAC web site were offline as of September 2016. As of August 6, 2007, the former homepage now denounces the new German law.

KisMac2 was project to continue development but is no longer maintained as well.

== See also ==
- Aircrack-ng
- iStumbler
- Kismet
- Netspot
- WiFi Explorer
