= NetScout Systems =

Provider of application and network performance management products

NetScout Systems, Inc.
- Type: Public
- Traded as: Nasdaq: NTCT; S&P 600 component
- Founded: 1984; 42 years ago
- Founders: Anil K. Singhal; Narendra Popat
- Headquarters: Westford, Massachusetts, U.S.
- Area served: Worldwide
- Key people: Anil K. Singhal (chairman, president, & CEO); Jean Bua (vice president & CFO)
- Revenue: ▼US$829 million (2024)
- Operating income: ▼US$−150 million (2024)
- Net income: ▼US$−148 million (2024)
- Total assets: ▼US$2.59 billion (2024)
- Total equity: ▼US$1.89 billion (2024)
- Number of employees: 2,296 (2024)
- Website: netscout.com

NETSCOUT Systems, Inc. (stylized as NETSCOUT) is an American technology company that specializes in software observability, deep packet inspection, DDoS mitigation and AIOps. Headquartered in Westford, Massachusetts, the company was founded in 1984 by Anil Singhal and Narendra Popat, originally under the name Frontier Software.

In July 2015, NetScout acquired the communications business of Danaher Corporation, including Arbor Networks, Fluke Networks, Tektronix Communications and VSS Monitoring. NetScout has subsidiaries in the Cayman Islands.

== History ==
NetScout Systems was founded by Anil Singhal and Narendra Popat as Frontier Software in 1984. NetScout created the first RMON-based Ethernet Probe in 1992.

In November 2007, NetScout acquired the Sniffer, Infinistream, and Network Intelligence product lines of Network General. NetScout merged both product lines to allow their Performance Manager product to use both probes and Infinistream technologies.

In April 2011, NetScout acquired voice and video management company, Psytechnics, from Ipswich, United Kingdom It then acquired Fox Replay from the Dutch company Fox-IT, and later that year, after many years of partnering and complementing solutions for network switch port aggregation, NetScout moved directly into competition with its partners by acquiring privately held Simena Networks.

In October 2014, NetScout Systems announced it had entered into a definitive agreement to acquire the Communications business of science and technology company Danaher Corporation for about $2.6 billion. Upon completion of the merger, Danaher's shareholders would own nearly 59.5 percent of the combined company, and NetScout shareholders would own the remaining stake. Analyst firm 451 Research, a technology-industry syndicated research and data firm, predicted in May 2015 that with the acquisition, NetScout will be the largest company in the network visibility management space, with "more than 3,000 employees and well over $1bn a year in revenue".

In July 2015, NetScout finalized its acquisition of the communications business of Danaher Corporation, including Arbor Networks (security systems), Fluke Networks (RF and Wi-Fi network troubleshooting and analytics), Tektronix Communications (traffic inspection, customer experience management and analytics) and VSS Monitoring (network packet brokers). In a prepared statement, the company noted that the acquisition "accelerates NetScout's strategic progress by enabling the company to offer [...] innovative service assurance and cyber security solutions" and adds new employees to NetScout.

== Acquisitions ==
NetScout Systems acquired Network General in 2007. Network General developed the original network packet sniffer (The Sniffer) in 1986; it merged with McAfee Associates in 1997 to form Network Associates. In mid-2004, Network Associates sold off the Sniffer Technologies business to Silver Lake Partners and Texas Pacific Group for $275 million in cash to form Network General. In early 2006, Network General acquired Fidelia Technology, adding the NetVigil Business Service Monitoring technology to its network and application performance analysis tools. In September 2007, Network General agreed to be acquired by NetScout Systems for $205 million.
