= Internet censorship in Indonesia =

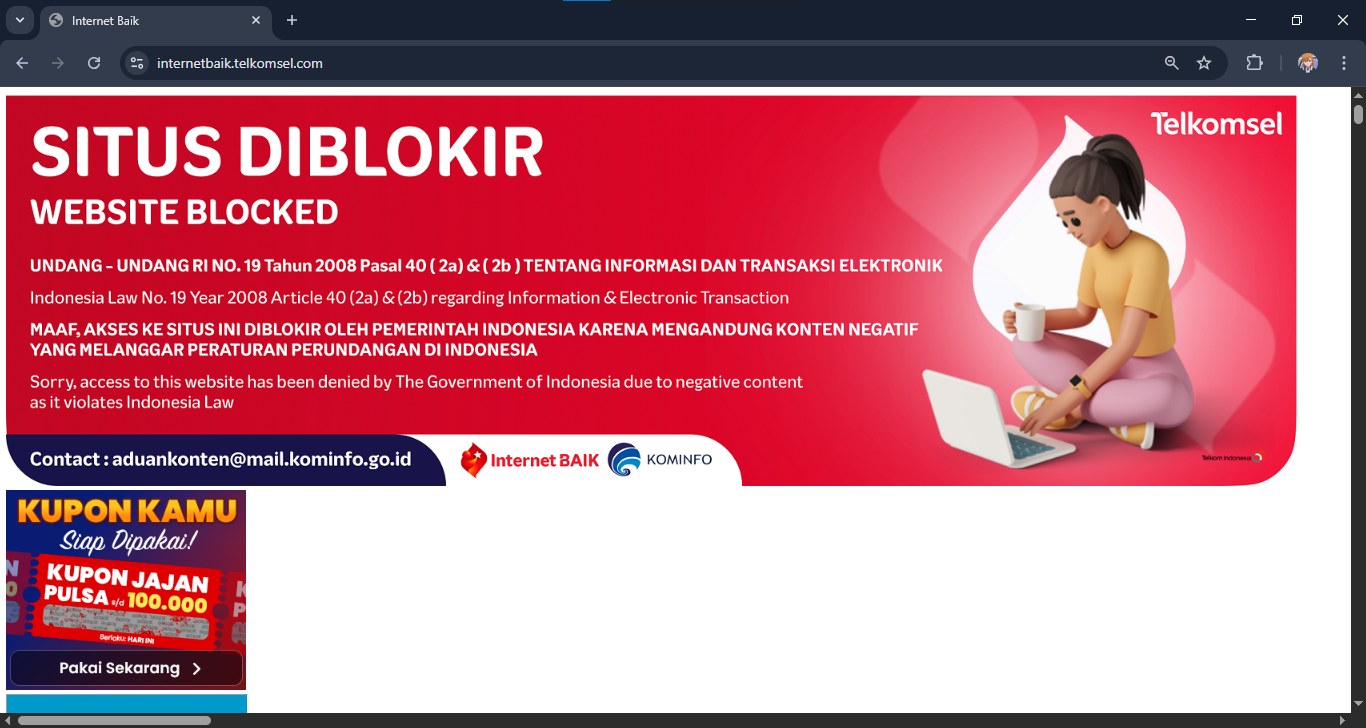
A website blocked by the Indonesian government. Visitors will be redirected to the Internet Baik homepage.

Internet filtering in Indonesia was deemed "substantial" in the social arena, "selective" in the political and internet tools arenas, and there was no evidence of filtering in the conflict/security arena by the OpenNet Initiative in 2011 based on testing done during 2009 and 2010. Testing also showed that Internet filtering in Indonesia is unsystematic and inconsistent, illustrated by the differences found in the level of filtering between ISPs. Indonesia was rated "partly free" in Freedom on the Net 2020 with a score of 49, midway between the end of the "free" range at 30 and the start of the "not free" range at 60.

Although the government of Indonesia holds a positive view about the internet as a means for economic development, it has become increasingly concerned over the impact of access to information. It has shown an interest in increasing its control over offensive online content, particularly pornographic and anti-Islamic online content. The government regulates such content through legal and regulatory frameworks and partnerships with ISP and Internet cafes.

Between 25 February and 30 April 2026, the country's Ministry of Communication and Digital Affairs (Komdigi) blocked access to Wikimedia's authentication domain (auth.wikimedia.org) due to the foundation's non-compliance of registering themselves as a private electronic service operator. This prevented users from logging in or creating accounts on all Wikimedia projects, including Wikipedia. Rights groups called for the restoration of normal access.

== Regulations ==
=== Information and Electronic Transactions Law (2008) ===
In March 2008, the government passed the Law on Information and Electronic Transactions (ITE Law), which broadened the authority of the Ministry of Communications and Information Technology (Kominfo) to include supervision of the flow of information and possible censorship of online content. In early 2010, the ministry published a draft Regulation on Multimedia Content that, if implemented, would require ISPs to filter or otherwise remove specific materials. The types of content listed include vaguely-worded categories such as pornography, gambling, hate incitement, threats of violence, exposure of private information, intellectual property, false information, and contents that degrade a person or group based on a physical or nonphysical attribute, such as disability. Following public outcry, the government announced that it would take time to process suggestions from the public before proceeding with the draft regulation.

Under the ITE Law, anyone convicted of committing defamation online faces up to six years in prison, and a fine of up to one billion rupiah (US$111,000). As of June 2010, there were at least eight cases in which citizens had been indicted on defamation charges under the ITE Law for comments on e-mail lists, blogs, or Facebook. Prosecutions under the ITE Law have contributed to an increased atmosphere of fear, caution, and self-censorship among online writers and average users.

In December 2023, the Government watered down the electronic information and transaction law (ITE) after critics accused the Government of using the law to stifle opposition. Part of the changes include a higher burden of proof for prosecutions and halving of the maximum sentence from four to two years.

=== Ministerial Regulation 5 (2020) ===
In November 2020, Ministerial Regulation 5 (MR5) was implemented, introducing a number of major obligations on all private electronic service operators (ESOs) that do business in Indonesia. All ESOs must register with the Ministry of Communication and Information Technology (Kominfo), and provide direct access to electronic systems and data to Kominfo and law enforcement when requested. ESOs must have at least one designee within the country to serve as a point of contact for their obligations. ESOs must not provide access to or "informing ways" of "prohibited content", defined as any content which violates Indonesian law or regulations, or creates "community anxiety" or "disturbance in public order". ESOs must also proactively monitor their services to prevent the dissemination of prohibited content. ESOs must comply with takedown requests for content that "disturbs the community or public order" within 24 hours of receipt, and child sexual abuse images, terrorism content, or any content that critically "disturbs the community or public order", within four hours. Violations of these obligations, including the obligation to register, are subject to fines and blockage.

MR5 has been criticised by human rights and free speech organisations such as Article 19 and the Electronic Frontier Foundation for its wide scope, mandating all internet services to be registered with the government, and the vague definition of "prohibited" content.

== Technical Implementations ==
=== National DNS ===
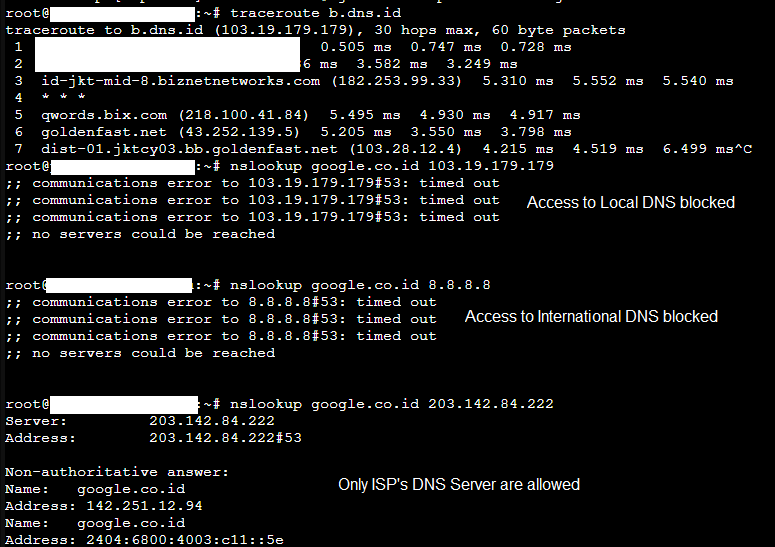
Screenshot of nslookup command from Biznet showing both international and local DNS in Indonesia are blocked

On May 31, 2015, Kominfo mandated all home and cellular ISPs operating in Indonesia to redirect port 53 for censorship purposes. This makes running own recursive server at home or changing the DNS in Indonesia impossible without workarounds such as encrypted DNS protocols as all traditional DNS requests would either be blocked or redirected to the ISP's DNS server.

Some ISPs have blocked access to popular encrypted DNS domains to prevent their users from using DNS over HTTPS and DNS over TLS to bypass censorship.

=== Deep Packet Inspection ===
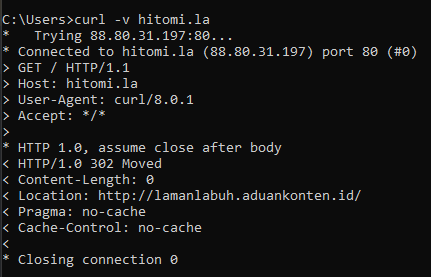
Screenshot of curl command to blocked website on ISP affected by DPI filtering in Indonesia

Around April 2022, Kominfo started to implement national firewall for censorship by utilizing Deep Packet Inspection on mobile provider such as Telkomsel, XL, 3, Indosat, and Smartfren under the project of TKPPSE which is the official name for the National DPI Firewall responsible for censoring website and monitoring internet user in Indonesia. One year later in April 2023, Kominfo started to implement it nationally on every border router going to international networks, causing many blocked websites to longer be accessible by simply using encrypted DNS. Providers in Indonesia such as PT Telkom Indonesia, FirstMedia, PT Saranainsan Mudaselaras, PT Indonesia Comnet Plus, PT Jala Lintas Media, PT Mora Telematika Indonesia, and other ISPs that have license from Kominfo are known for implementing DPI to have direct connection to international network.

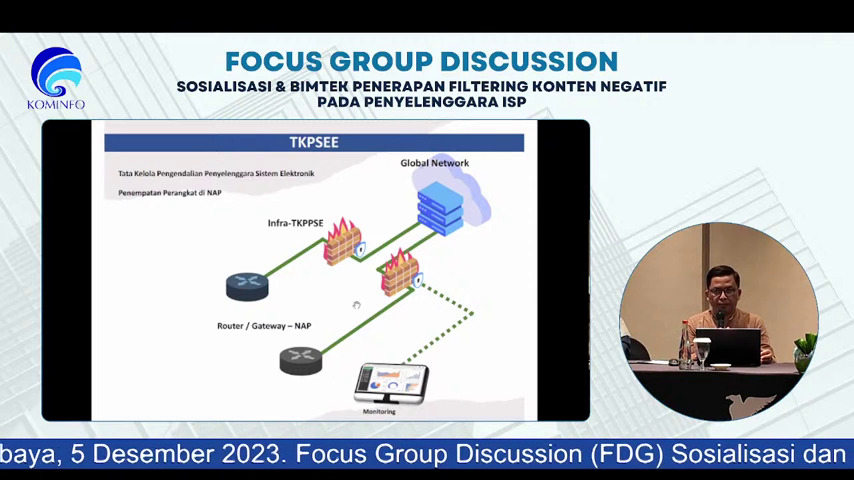
Kominfo official sharing how DPI implementation is implemented on Indonesia

According to the report by Dirjen Aptika Kominfo in 2023 in page 136, the TKPPSE National Firewall operates as follows:

1. When a user in Indonesia trying to access a website from affected ISP, their packet is being duplicated by Network Packet Broker in ISP network to be sent to the central DPI appliances for further monitoring.
2. The DPI appliances check if the user is trying to visit blacklisted site listed on government blacklist.
3. If yes, the DPI appliances will sent a forged RST packet to the client and server so the site cannot be accessed for https, and inject a fake 302 redirection packet to the national block page (http://lamanlabuh.aduankonten.id) if accessed via http since it's unencrypted.
4. The TKKPSE (DPI) appliance will analyze the data and send it to the Central Kominfo Datacenter to report the domain that the user trying to access along with the IP address associated with them.
5. The data saved in the Central Kominfo Datacenter will have maximum retention period of 7 days.

=== Prohibition for ISP to connect directly to outside without NAP ===
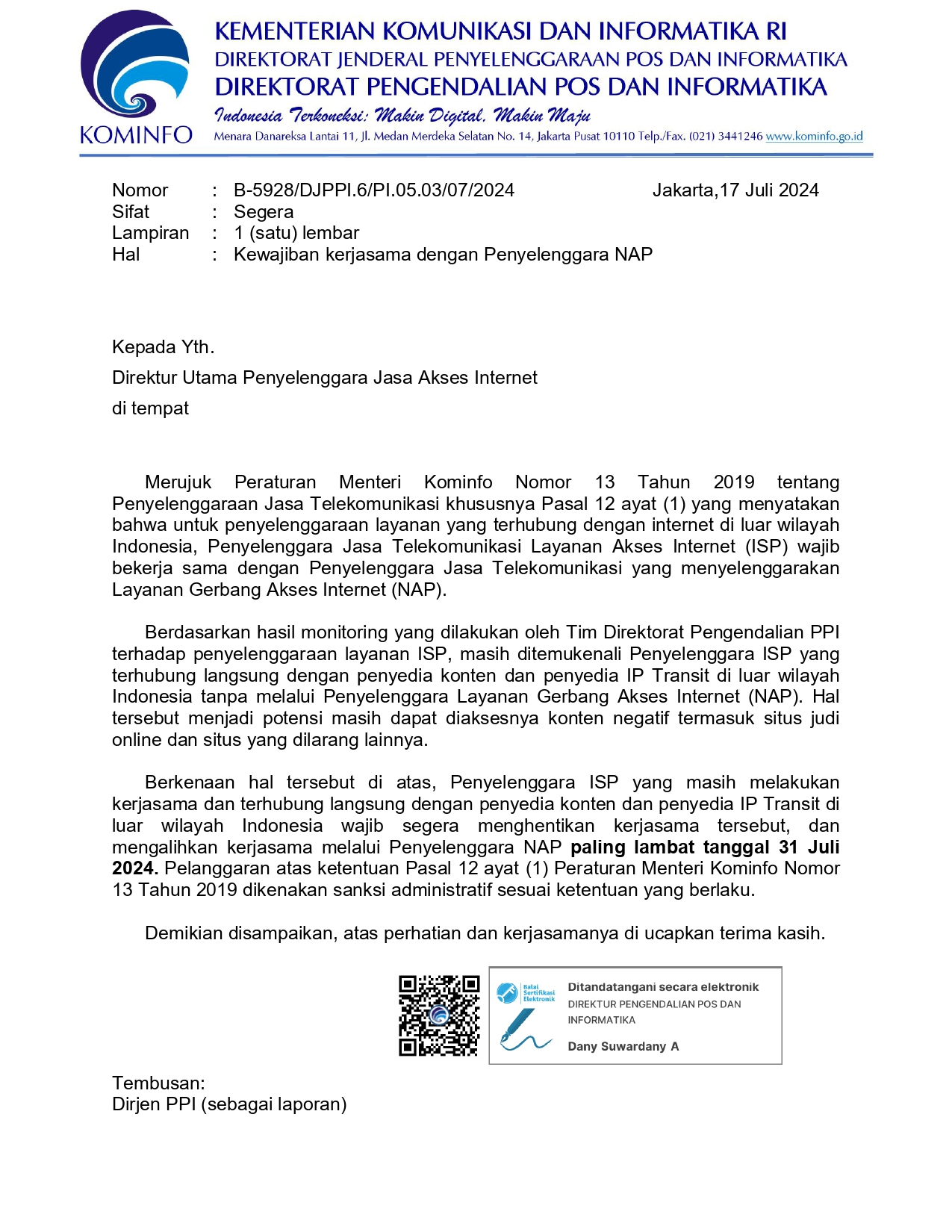
Kominfo Warning Letter to ISP to disconnect from Tier 1 and any Foreign Internet Exchange

On 17 July 2024, Kominfo started to send a letter to existing ISP to disconnect from Foreign Internet Exchange and Tier 1 network before 31 July and mandate their international traffic have to go through licensed ISP with Network Access Provider (NAP) license for filtering which license is limited to 40 ISPs. This is to ensure that the existing censorship mechanism (e.g. TKPPSE, Tata Kelola Pengendalian Penyelenggaraan Sistem Elektronik; Control Governance of Electronic System Implementation) affects all ISPs in Indonesia.

== Notable blocks ==
=== During protest and riots ===
On 22 May 2019, Indonesian government blocked Facebook, WhatsApp, and Instagram for three days after the 22 May riots in Jakarta to prevent hoaxes and fake news of the situation during the riots from spreading. The event also increased awareness of using VPN to access blocked content during the block.

On 22 August 2019, amid Papua protests, Indonesia's Communication Ministry said that on the previous night they cut off telecommunication data and Internet in Papua to "curb hoax and most importantly stop people from sharing provocative messages that can incite racial hatred" until and "if the situation has calmed". As of 2 September 2019, the Internet blackout was ongoing. The government announced a ban on fake news and the "carrying out or spreading separatism in expressing opinions in public".

=== News censorship ===
In late May 2025, Indonesia blocked access to Internet Archive and Wayback Machine after the government alleged a censored article in prominent news site Detik.com that had been removed due to its criticism on the National Armed Forces had been archived there. However on 29 May 2025, the government unblocked it. According to an official statement from the Ministry of Communication and Digital Affairs, the reason of the block was because of pornography and gambling content.

=== Muhammad imagery restrictions ===
Media reported that selective blocking of some web sites for brief periods began in 2007–2008. Indonesia ordered ISPs to block YouTube in April 2008 after Google reportedly did not respond to the government's request to remove the film Fitna by the Dutch parliamentarian Geert Wilders, which purportedly mocked the Islamic prophet, Muhammad. In May 2010, when an account on Facebook promoted a competition to draw Muhammad, government officials took a more focused approach and sent a letter to Facebook urging closure of the account, asked all ISPs to limit access to the account's link, and invited the Indonesian Association of Internet Cafe Entrepreneurs to restrict access to the group. Due to opposition from bloggers and civil societies, however, ISPs disregarded the government's requests, and the account remained accessible.

=== Social media ===
In May 2014, amid an online pornography crackdown, Vimeo and Imgur were blocked permanently by the government due to the inclusion of nudity and sexual content. (Note: Siaran Pers Tentang PENANGANAN VIMEO.COM)

Also in the same period, Reddit was blocked in Indonesia for the same reason. The block was later lifted on July 2, 2026 after Reddit agreed to implement geoblocking for illegal content and comply with local Electronic System Provider (PSE) registration.

In 2017, Telegram was blocked, as it was being used to spread "radical and terrorist propaganda." Telegram was later unblocked after several agreements with the government.

As of September 2018, some websites including Vimeo and Tumblr were blocked. Tumblr was put back unblocked on December 17, 2018.

On 28 March 2026, Indonesia banned all social media users below the age of 16 including YouTube, TikTok, Facebook, Instagram, Threads, and Roblox to prevent pornography, cyberbullying, online scams, and child abuse, which as of April 26, however, has not fully worked and still encountered a few problems.

=== Video games ===
In late-June 2022, Kominfo announced a 27 July 2022 deadline before it would begin blocking services for failure to register. On 30 July it was reported that Kominfo had ordered the blockage of eight ESOs, including Electronic Arts' Origin, Epic Games, PayPal, Valve Software (Steam and published games Counter-Strike: Global Offensive and Dota 2), Xandr, and Yahoo!. Valve Corporation and Yahoo!'s blocks had been lifted since 2 August.

Around the end of December 2023, Indonesia blocked access to Hypixel, a popular Minecraft server without clear reasons by Kominfo itself.

=== Wikimedia ===
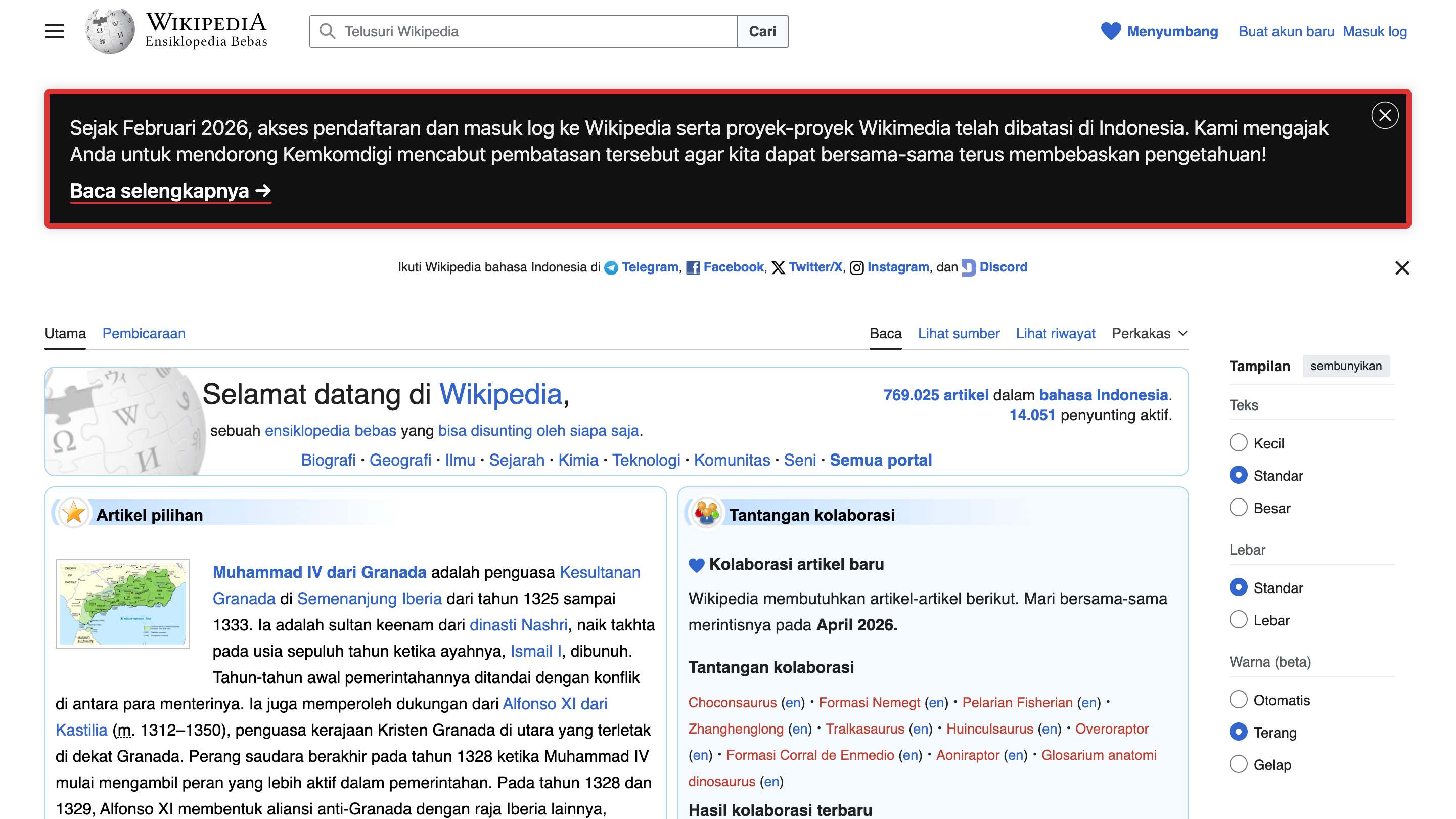
Banner on Indonesian Wikipedia, 14 April 2026

Since 25 February 2026, Kominfo, now rebranded as Komdigi, has blocked access to Wikimedia's authentication domain (auth.wikimedia.org) due to the foundation's non-compliance of registering themselves as an ESO. This prevents users from logging in or creating new accounts on all Wikimedia projects, including Wikipedia. Human rights groups, including the Coalition for Democratization and Moderation of Indonesian Digital Space (Koalisi Damai) and the Southeast Asia Freedom of Expression Network (SAFEnet) urged the government to unblock the site. The block later was lifted on 30 April 2026 after the foundation registering as an ESO.

On 25 March 2026, Komdigi blocked all access to Wikimedia Commons, an online repository of free-use media. The block was later lifted a day later. On 16 April 2026, the Indonesian government announced that it will block the entirety of Wikipedia and all other Wikimedia projects within 7 business days. The block was cancelled due to Wikimedia already registering as an ESO.

=== Others ===
On 21 July 2023, Indonesia blocked access to the Distributed Denial of Secrets website.

On 29 July 2024, Indonesia blocked access to the DuckDuckGo search engine for failing to comply with censorship in Indonesia.
