= Psytechnics =

Telecommunications company

- Type: Private
- Industry: Software
- Founded: Ipswich, United Kingdom (2000)
- Headquarters: Ipswich, United Kingdom
- Products: Experience Manager, PESQ
- Website: www.psytechnics.com

Psytechnics is a telecommunications company, spun out of British Telecom's research labs in December 2000. The company's technology is behind 7 ITU standards, including PESQ ITU-T P.862. They developed real-time Quality of Experience monitoring software for calls made with Voice over IP, video, telepresence, and unified communications networks.

Psytechnics was acquired by NetScout Systems on April 1, 2011.
