= Network General =

Defunct American networking company

Network General Corporation
- Formerly: Network Associates (1997–2004)
- Company type: Public
- Industry: Computer networking
- Founded: May 13, 1986; 39 years ago in Menlo Park, California, United States
- Founders: Harry Saal; Len Shustek
- Defunct: 2007; 19 years ago
- Fate: Acquired by McAfee Associates in 1997; assets spun-off in 2004; said assets acquired by NetScout Systems in 2007
- Number of employees: ≈ 1,000 (1995, peak)

Network General Corporation was an American technology company active between 1986 and 2007 and based in Silicon Valley. Founded in 1986 by Harry Saal and Len Shustek to develop and market network packet and protocol analyzers, the company's flagship product, the Sniffer was the market leader in its field for many years. In 1997, Network General was acquired by McAfee Associates (MCAF) for $1.3 billion, and the two companies merged to form Network Associates. In 2004, Network Associates sold off most of the patents originally belonging to Network General to a group of investors including Saal, who founded a new Network General Corporation. In 2007, NetScout Systems acquired the new Network General for $205 million.

== History ==
Network General Corporation was founded in May 1986 by Harry Saal and Len Shustek to develop and market network protocol analyzers. Saal, the company's primary founder, president, and CEO, had previously worked at IBM as a software engineer before founding Nestar Systems, his first startup dedicated to computer networking, in October 1978 with three others, including Shustek, Jim Hinds and Nick Fortis. Although successful at first, Nestar eventually floundered and was sold off in 1986. Deciding they wanted another go at a computer networking company, Saal and Shustek founded Network General in Menlo Park, California, in 1986.

In the year of the company's founding, Network General introduced the Sniffer. The inspiration behind the Sniffer was an internal test tool that had been developed within Nestar. Between the company's inception and the end of 1988, the Sniffer became Network General's flagship product, and the company sold $8.9 million worth of Sniffers and associated services, earning them $1.8 million in net profit. Financing was initially provided only by the founders until an investment of several million by TA Associates in late 1987. The company grew from having only two employees in 1986 to 15 employees in 1988. In February 1989, the company raised $17.5 million with a public stock offering of 1.90 million shares on the Nasdaq as NETG, underwritten by Alex. Brown & Sons. In August 1989, they sold an additional 1.27 million shares in a secondary offering, and in April 1992, an additional 2.22 million shares in a third offering.

By December 1989, Network General employed 68 people. In the same month the company bought Legend Software, a one-person company in New Jersey that had been founded by Dan Hansen. Their product was a network monitor called LAN Patrol, which was enhanced, rebranded, and sold by Network General as WatchDog, introduced in April 1990. The WatchDog sold only half as well as investors had anticipated within a quarter-year of its introduction, and Network General was forced to buy back $175,000 worth of back-stock to avoid a glut in the company's distribution networks. In August 1991, the company acquired Progressive Computing, a manufacturer and supplier of equipment for wide area networks. The company then grew to have 225 total employees in its workforce across 19 worldwide offices. Progressive Computing was kept around as an independent subsidiary of Network General; it released a handheld WAN protocol analyzer, the LM1 PocketScope, in early 1992.

By 1995 Network General had sold $631 million worth of Sniffer-related products. It had almost 1,000 employees and was selling about 1,000 Sniffers a month. Hewlett-Packard, which had introduced packet analyzers several years after the Sniffer was introduced, was Network General's largest rival, according to Saal.

In December 1997 Network General merged with McAfee Associates (MCAF) to form Network Associates, in a stock swap deal valued at $1.3 billion. Weeks later, Network Associates bought Pretty Good Privacy, Inc. (PGP), the encryption company founded in 1991 by Phil Zimmerman, for $35M in cash. Saal and Shustek left the company shortly thereafter.

In 2002, much of the PGP product line was sold to the newly formed PGP Corporation for an undisclosed amount. It was subsequently acquired by Symantec in 2010.

In mid-2004, Network Associates sold off the Sniffer technology business to investors led by Silver Lake Partners and Texas Pacific Group for $275 million in cash, creating a new Network General Corporation. That same year, Network Associates readopted its founder's name and became McAfee Inc. In September 2007, the new Network General was acquired by NetScout Systems for $205 million. NetScout marketed Sniffer products as late as 2009, with the Sniffer Global network analysis suite of software; in 2018 it divested its handheld network test tool business, including the Sniffer, to StoneCalibre.
