= Harry Saal =

American technology entrepreneur

- Education: Columbia University (BA, MA, PhD)
- Occupations: Entrepreneur; executive; inventor

Harry J. Saal is an American technology entrepreneur, executive, and philanthropist. Saal co-founded Nestar Systems with Len Shustek.

== Biography ==
Saal was a Westinghouse Science Talent Search finalist in 1960 and received his B.A., M.A., and Ph.D., all from Columbia University. He joined the Stanford University Linear Accelerator Center after receiving his doctorate in physics. He was also a lecturer in Stanford's computer science department.

Saal was a visiting professor of the State University of New York from 1972 to 1973 before joining the IBM Corporation. He worked for IBM's scientific center in Israel and then IBM General Products division in San Jose, California. In 1979, he left IBM to found Nestar Systems, a pioneer in developing local area network systems for personal computers, with Len Shustek. In 1986, Saal, co-founded Network General Corporation, a network diagnostics company which developed the Sniffer, a protocol analyzer, with Shustek. He served as CEO and President of Smart Valley Inc., from 1993 to 1998, a nonprofit organization serving to enhance the quality of life in the Silicon Valley. He was also a director and vice chairman of Inprise Corporation from 1993 to 1996, a director of Network Associates from 1997 to 1998, and chairman of Retrotope until 2020.

In 2002, Saal was chosen by the United States Department of Justice to serve to lead the technical committee charged with monitoring and enforcing the Microsoft anti-trust case.

Saal is active in civic life. He served as a director and was chairman of the Silicon Valley Community Foundation. He was also a director of the San Jose Museum of Art, American Institute of Mathematics, and served on the board of advisors of University of Maryland Business School, Hebrew University of Jerusalem, and the Henry Crown Fellowship Program of the Aspen Institute. He has been a director of the Ben-Gurion University of the Negev since 2012.

Between 1989 and 1996, he has given away more than 20 percent of his net worth to various philanthropic causes, including medical research, education charities, and the assistance of Jewish refugees from Russia.
