= Arbor Networks =

American software company (2000–2015)

- Type: Subsidiary
- Industry: Software
- Founded: 2000
- Defunct: 2015
- Fate: Acquired by NetScout Systems
- Headquarters: Chelmsford, MA
- Website: netscout.com/arbor

Arbor Networks was a software company founded in 2000 and based in Burlington, Massachusetts, United States, which sold network security and network monitoring software, used – according to the company's claims – by over 90% of all Internet service providers. The company's products are used to protect networks from denial-of-service attacks, botnets, computer worms, and efforts to disable network routers. The service employs port scanning from the IP range 146.88.240.0/24 in which threats are being detected. Arbor was acquired by NetScout Systems in 2015.

== History ==
The company was founded in 2000 when co-founders Farnam Jahanian and Rob Malan spun out research from the University of Michigan, sponsored by DARPA, Cisco, and Intel. They were joined by students Jonathan Arnold, Matthew Smart, and Jonathan Poland, and entrepreneurs Ted Julian and Dug Song to make the founding team. The company raised $11 million in a round of venture capital. Later, in August 2002, the company raised another $22 million in a second round of venture capital, led by Thomas Weisel Venture Partners, with participants that included Battery Ventures and Cisco Systems, among others. In January 2008, Arbor acquired Ellacoya Networks, a company which provides broadband traffic shaping products. The acquisition was expected to increase the total addressable market (TAM) for Arbor to $750 million in 2008, and to $1.5 billion by the end of 2009. In March 2009, Arbor worked with 100 ISPs to create a new network monitoring system, called ATLAS 2.0. In October 2009, the company estimated that Google paid almost nothing for YouTube's bandwidth, noting that Google probably used dark fibre instead to run the website.

On August 31, 2010, Tektronix Communications announced that it has completed its acquisition of Arbor Networks. Upon completion of the acquisition, Arbor Networks joins Danaher Corporation's portfolio of communications and enterprise companies, which includes Tektronix Communications.

On September 3, 2013, Arbor Networks announced that it had acquired privately held Packetloop, a leader in Security Analytics based in Sydney, Australia.

In 2015 NetScout Systems acquired Arbor along with Fluke, Tektronix Communications (TekComms), and VSS, from Danaher.

== Company ==
Arbor has strategic partnerships with Cisco, IBM, and Juniper Networks. In addition to its headquarters in Burlington, Massachusetts, the company also has offices in Ann Arbor, Michigan, London, and Singapore. Wired stated that due to the popularity of Arbor's software among ISPs, the company "likely knows more about the [Internet's] ebbs and flows than anyone outside of the National Security Agency".
