= Nestar =

Pre-internet networking vendor

Nestar Systems, Inc.
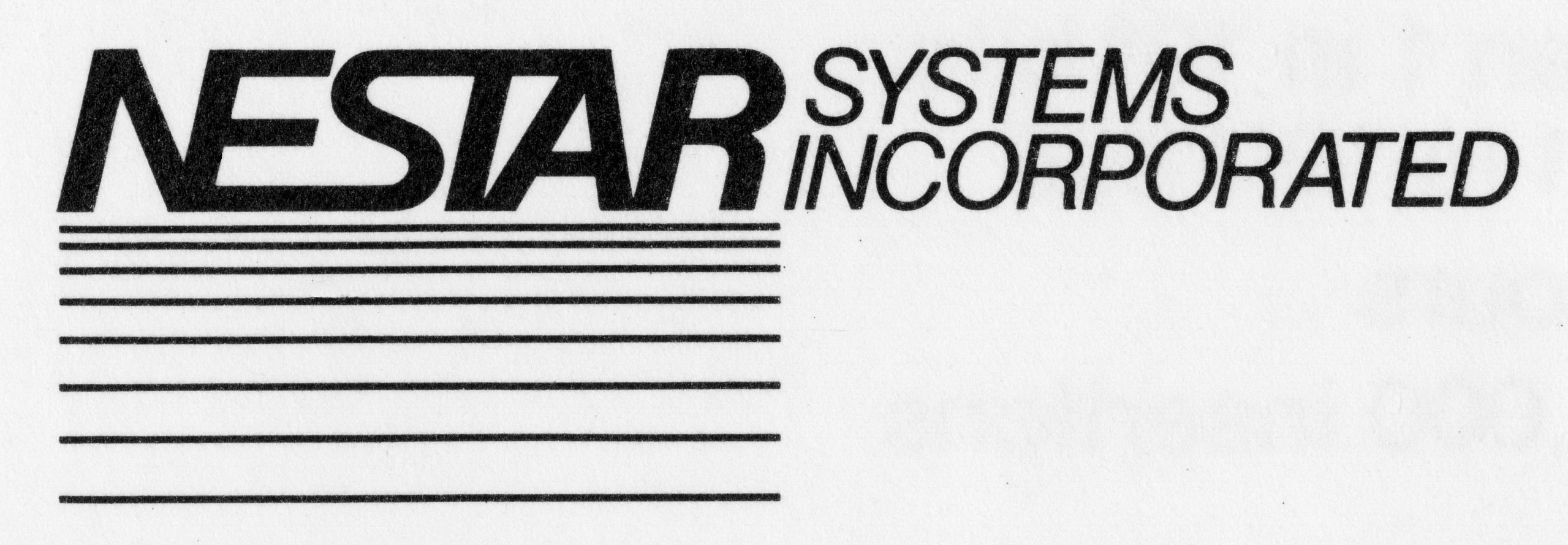
- Type: Privately held company
- Industry: Local area computer networking
- Founded: October 13, 1978
- Founder: Harry Saal, Len Shustek, Jim Hinds, Nick Fortis
- Defunct: 1986
- Fate: Acquired by Digital Switch Corporation (now DSC Communications)
- Headquarters: Palo Alto, CA
- Products: Cluster/One and PLAN series local area networks; BASIC Programmer's Toolkit
- Subsidiaries: Palo Alto ICs

Nestar Systems, Inc., was an early independent manufacturer of pre-internet local area networks for personal computers from 1978 to 1986 and was considered "a pioneer in the industry". It produced three major generations of products:

- Cluster/One (September 1979) provided program file sharing for up to 30 Commodore PET, Apple II, and Radio Shack TRS-80 personal computers. A PET with two 8" floppy disks was the program server that polled for client requests using a daisy-chained flat ribbon cable up to 250 feet long.
- Cluster/One Model A (March 1980) provided general communication among Apple II and Apple III personal computers using a parallel flat ribbon cable with arbitrary branching topology up to 1000 feet long. Apple II computers served as file servers (with floppy disks, hard disks, and cartridge tape backup), print servers, and communications servers linking multiple networks over modems. Applications included file sharing, electronic mail, database management, and financial management.
- PLAN Series (December 1982) provided general communication among Apple II and IBM PC personal computers using Datapoint's ARCNET network and Xerox's XNS networking protocols. Proprietary small, medium, and large servers, using Motorola 68000 microprocessors, served as file servers (including tape backup and shadow servers), spooled print servers, and communications servers. Applications included file sharing, electronic mail, database management, financial management, IBM 3270 terminal emulation to link to mainframes, Telex simulation, and interactive chat.

In 1986 Nestar was sold to Digital Switch Corporation (now DSC Communications) of Plano, Texas, which continued to develop some of the product line for about two years.

== Corporate history ==
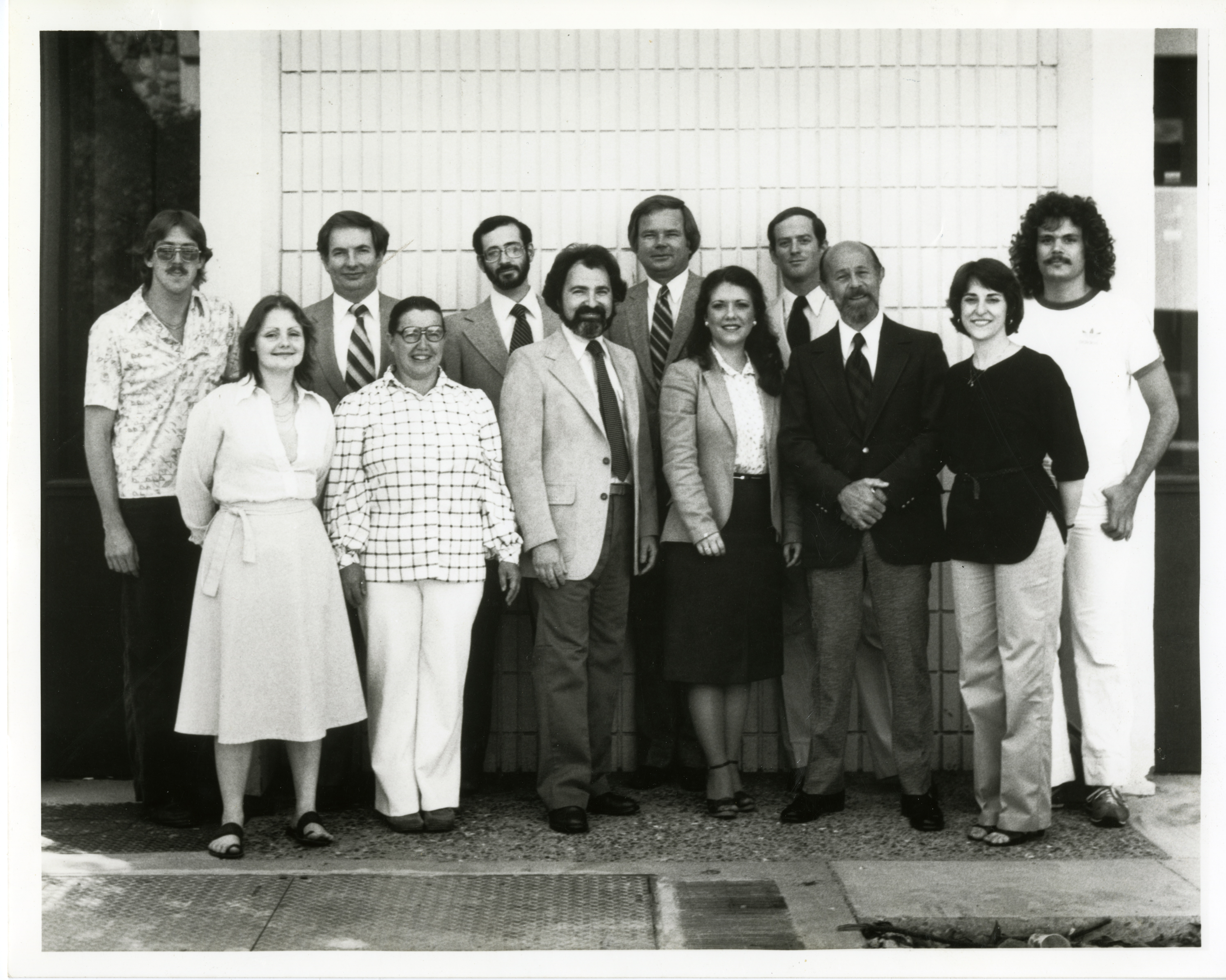
Nestar Systems employees, July 1980; front, L to R: Mary Kroenig, Nonie Sparks, Harry Saal, Kim Franzetti, Nick Fortis, Carol D'Esopo Saal, Jeff Levin. back, L to R: John Henry, Colin Crook (from Rank), Len Shustek, Don Anderson, Skip Stritter

Nestar was founded in Palo Alto, California on October 13, 1978. by Harry Saal, Len Shustek, Jim Hinds, and Nick Fortis, to make networks that allowed sharing of centralized services like disks and printers for the then-new personal computers: Commodore PET, Apple II, and Radio Shack TRS-80. Initial funding was provided by the founders, primarily Saal. By July 1980 the company had 11 employees.

In July 1980, the Rank Organization in the UK purchased a 40% stake in Nestar Systems, and created a wholly Rank-owned subsidiary, Zynar Ltd in Uxbridge, England, to cooperate in the development of future systems. In March 1982 there was a $2.5M second round of financing, and there were over 50 employees. By 1983 Rank had made additional investments which increased their ownership in Nestar to 59%. By October 1984 they owned 85%. Annual revenue had grown from $318.000 in 1979 to $10,032,000 in 1984, but profitability had still not been achieved even though they were one of the top 10 PC local area network vendors

In August 1985 it was announced that Nestar was to be bought by Net America, a Dallas-based startup common carrier founded by Sam Wyly, who also founded University Computing Company and was chairman of Sterling Software, Inc. The acquisition was even announced, but it never happened. Nestar was instead acquired a year later, in October 1986, by Digital Switch Corporation (soon to become DSC Communications) of Plano, Texas. They operated the company as a subsidiary called "DSC Nestar Systems".

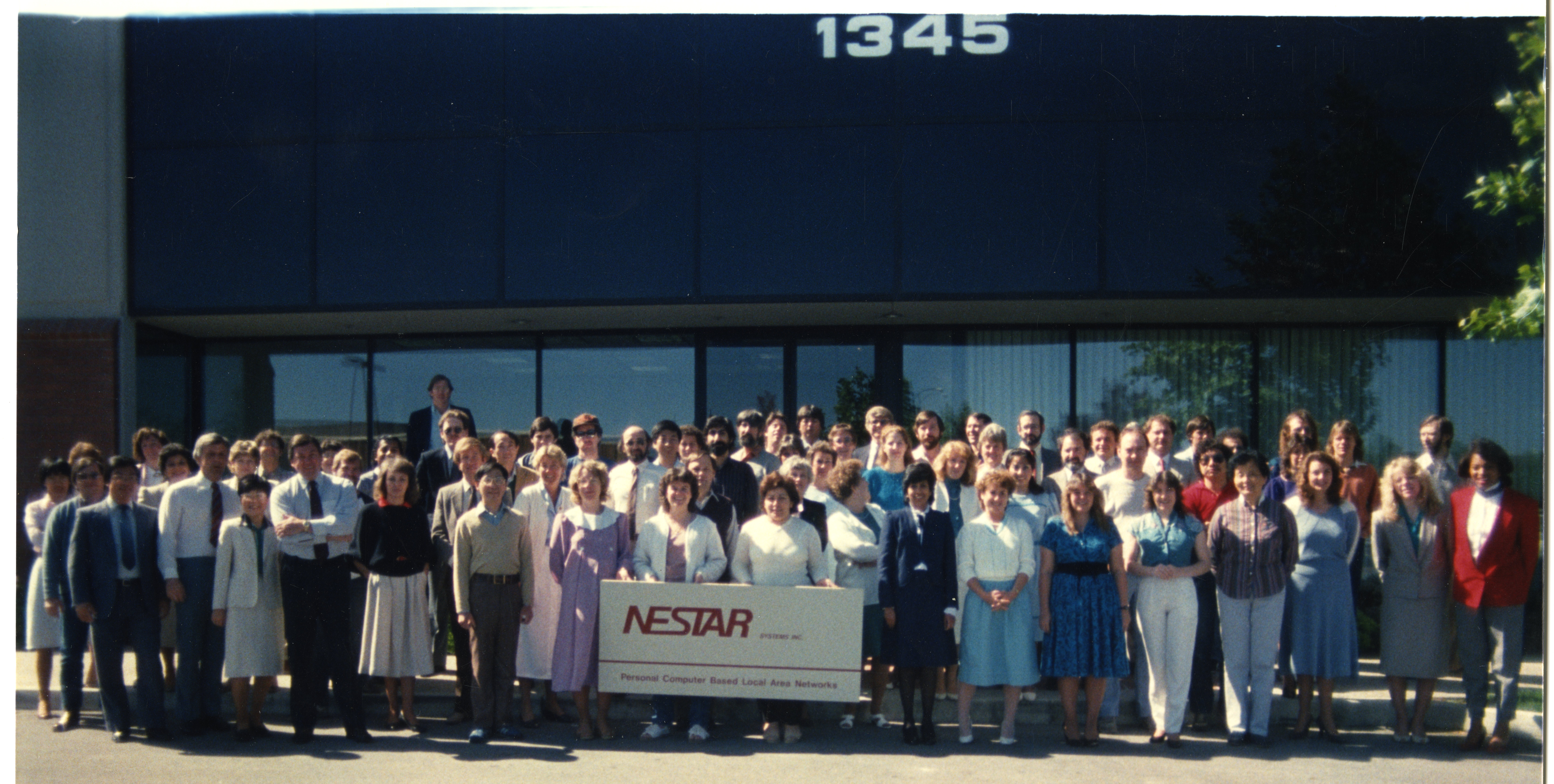
Nestar Systems employees, 1986

At the time of the acquisition by DSC, Nestar founders Saal and Shustek left the company and received the rights to a Nestar internal local area network test tool that they developed into Network General's Sniffer protocol analyzer.

In August 1979 Nestar had created a wholly owned subsidiary called "Palo Alto ICs'". Its only product was an add-on to the Commodore PET computer called the "BASIC Programmer's Toolkit" a collection of programming aids for the Commodore PET computer distributed as a hardware read-only-memory (ROM). It was sold both by Nestar and the Zynar subsidiary of Rank.

Nestar only filed two trademark registrations: one for "Toolkit" (first used 8/27/79, filed 10/13/81, registered 12/13/82, cancelled 4/17/90), and one for "Cluster/One" (first used 12/1/78, filed 5/29/79, registered 4/6/82, cancelled 11/18/88). They received one patent for the addressing scheme used in the first Cluster/One system.

== LAN systems ==
=== Cluster/One (Model One) ===
The Cluster/One system released in September 1979 allowed Commodore PET, Apple II, or TRS-80 user stations called "Drones" to save and load programs from a PET central file server called the "Queen". The price for the Queen started at $4995, and Drone interfaces ranged from $25 to $150.

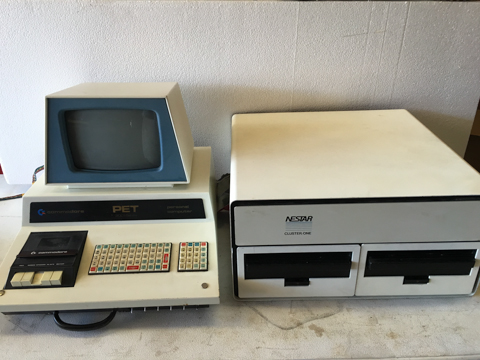
Nestar Cluster/One Queen

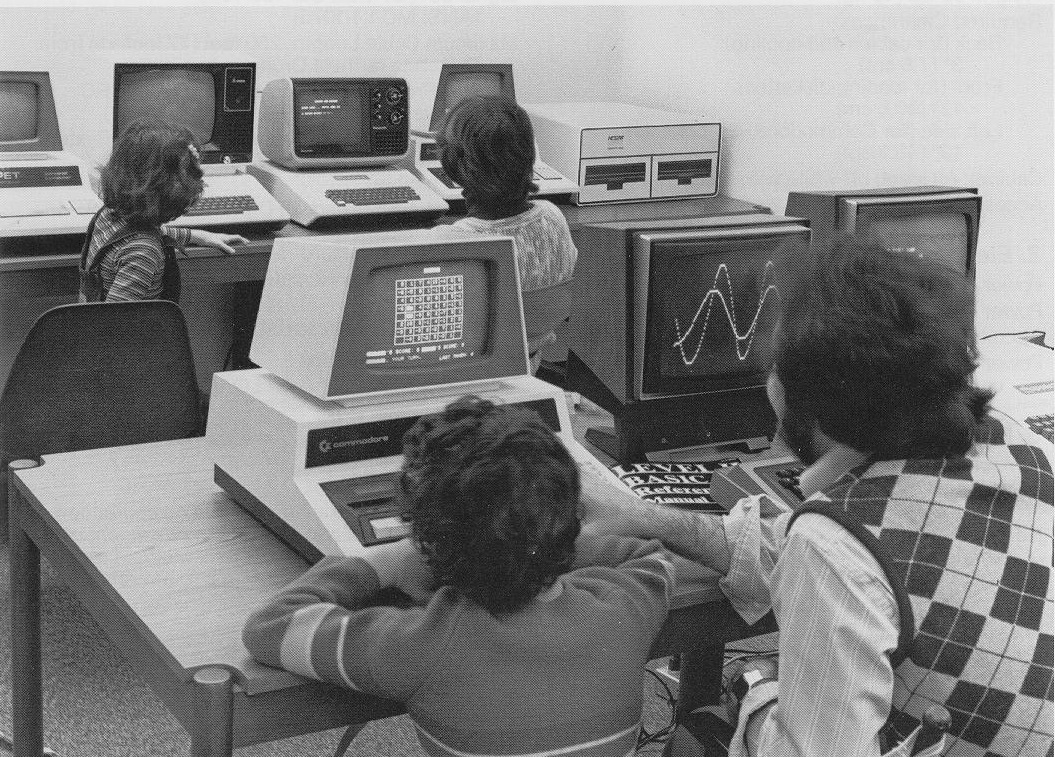
Nestar Cluster/One system in use

The hardware for the Cluster/One network used a 26-wire flat ribbon cable daisy-chained from the Queen to each successive Drone; each Drone had an "in" and an "out" network connection. The Queen could attach to two network segments, each with up to 15 Drones connected through up to 250' of cable. Data was sent in 8-bit parallel using 3 clock lines. The transfer speed was 80K bits/second, and the proprietary block-oriented protocol provided for error-checking and retries.

The Drones were addressed by the Queen using a patented scheme that allowed the hardware and software at each station to be identical, yet gave each Drone a unique address without switches or jumpers. Eight address lines were divided into groups of 3 and 5, which are relatively prime. A drone is selected only when the first line of each group is activated. Both groups are rotated as they pass through the Drone's network connector, so exactly one of the 15 Drones will be selected when the Queen activates one line in each group.

The Cluster/One was sold through retail computer dealers and system integrators, including in Japan. Despite publicity, marketing efforts, and good reviews, it did not sell well. As Shustek says in a 2002 oral history interview, "This is before the IBM PC. Businesses didn’t treat any of these machines as serious computers. We couldn’t get a business to buy Apple II’s or Commodore PETs or TRS-80s, because they were toys... We had some modest success selling to schools, who used them for kids for training and games and whatnot. But schools didn’t have a lot of money."

=== Cluster/One Model A ===
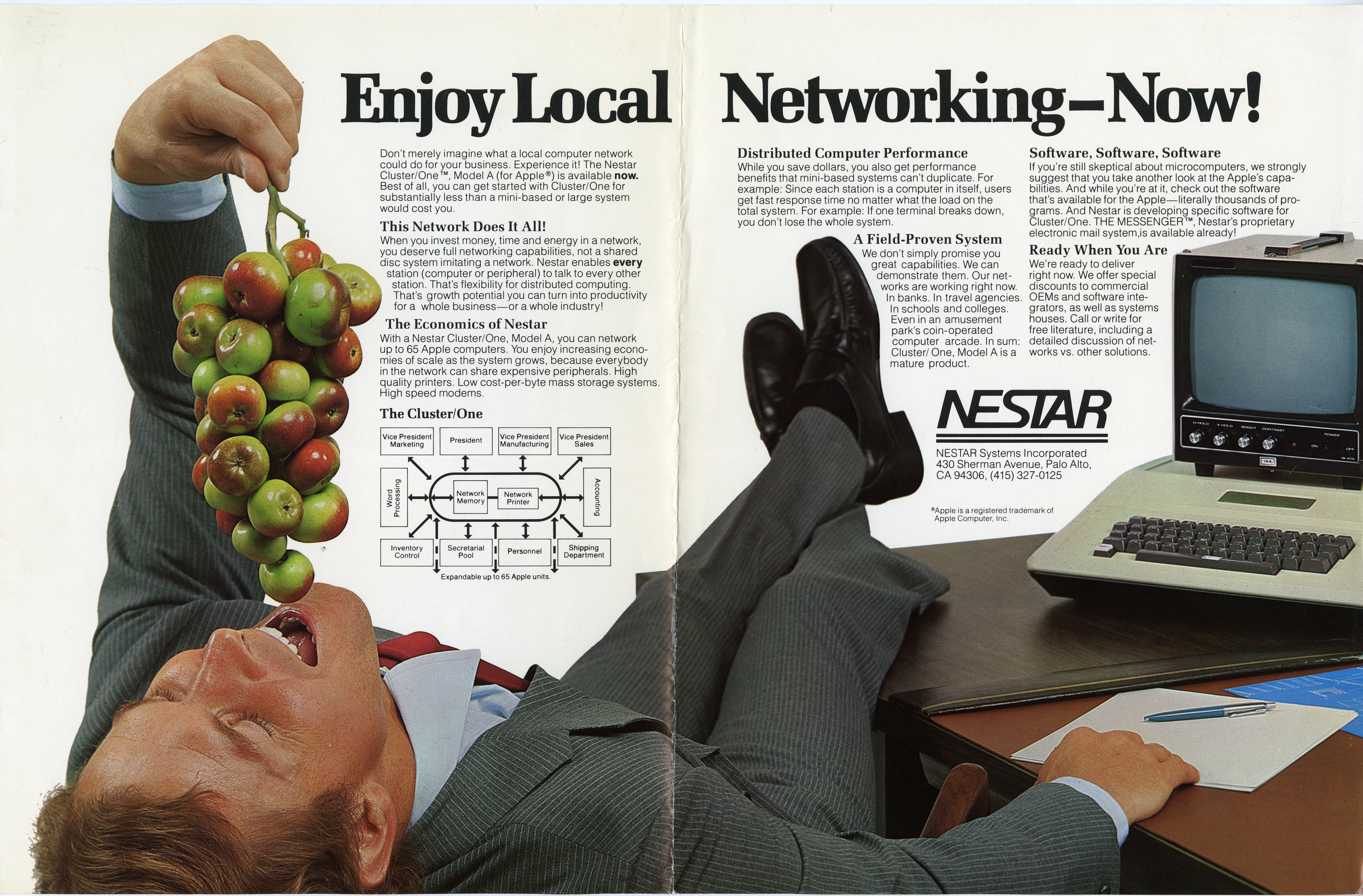

The Cluster/One Model A system, released in July 1980, implemented peer-to-peer local area networking for up to 64 Apple II and Apple III personal computers. The system is described in the Computer History Museum's "Revolution: The First 2000 Years of Computing" physical and virtual exhibit, in the networking gallery

One or more Apple II computers could be a dedicated networked file server (NFS). Each had a dual 1.2 MB floppy disk unit whose drives were monitored for diskette changes. An external 16.5 MB or 33 MB 14" Winchester hard disk was optional. A clock/calendar card with battery maintained the date and time. Other Apple II computers could be print servers, file transfer servers, gateway servers, and communications servers for remote access to mainframe and terminals.

The Model A network used 8-bit parallel data transmission over 16-wire flat ribbon cable. Up to 64 stations could be interconnected by any arbitrary cable topology without loops, using up to 1000 feet of cable. In addition to the 8 data lines, the cable had one carrier assert line, 2 handshake lines, and 4 grounds. The link-level network protocol was a version of CSMA/CD: carrier sense, multiple access. Unlike for Ethernet, the separate carrier line was asserted between related data transmissions so that the ACK or NAK for a packet could follow immediately without having to reacquire the channel. The transmission speed was 240 kilobits per second, which was the fastest rate that could be supported by a software-driven network interface running on an 8-bit processor such as the 6502 in the Apple II.

Suggested retail prices at the time of the February 1980 Model A announcement ranged from $5995 for a dual floppy disk system to $9995 for a 33 MB hard disk system. By July 1981 the floppy disk system suggested retail price had been reduced to $3595, but the hard disk system was increased to $9995 because of hard disk supply shortages, with a separate $1995 charge for the file server software.

The Model A was described in published papers, trade magazine reviews and customer testimonials.

=== PLAN ("Personal Local Area Network") Series ===
Unlike Nestar's first two systems, which were based on proprietary local area network designs and standard microcomputers as servers, the third system did the opposite: it used a commercially available network and proprietary servers. The PLAN Series began shipping in 1982 based around the PLAN 4000 file server.

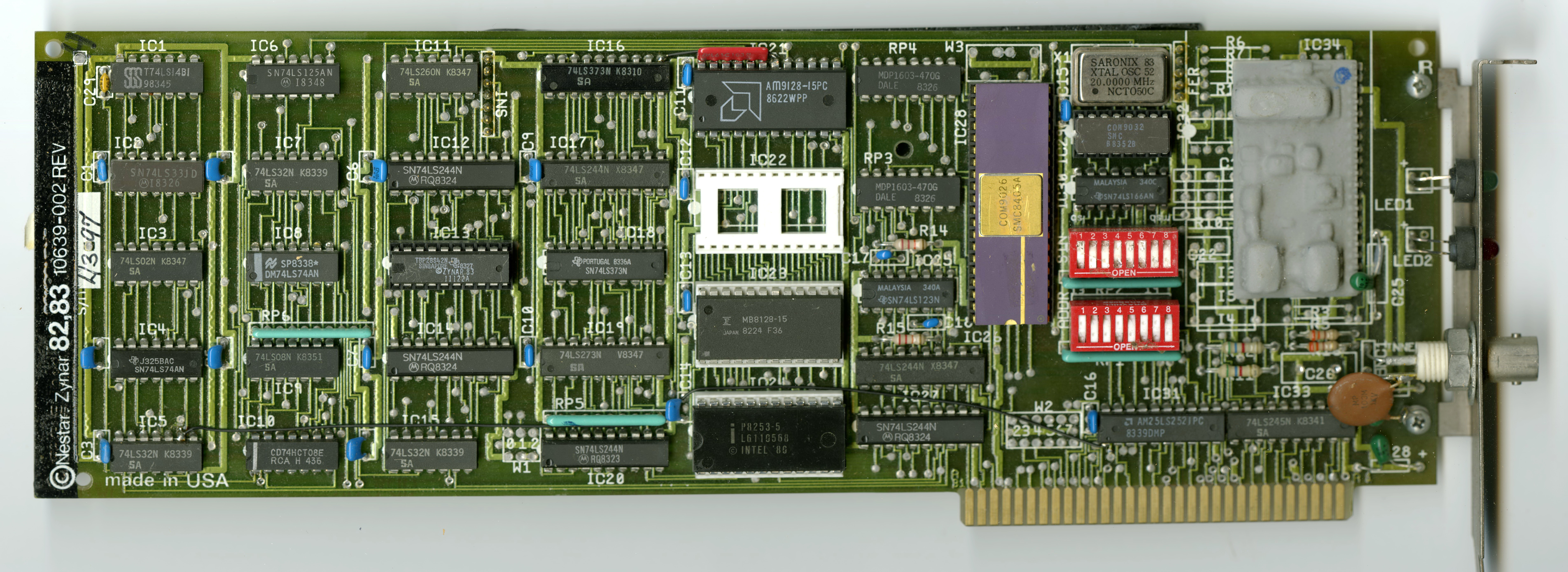
IBM PC ARCNET network interface card

The PLAN network was based on Datapoint's ARCNET, which used a token-passing protocol for link acquisition rather than polling (like for the Cluster/One) or CSMA (like for the Cluster/One Model A). The networking protocols at layers 3 ("Network") and 4 ("Transport") of the ISO model were based on Xerox's XNS networking protocols, which had been placed in the public domain in 1977. At layer 5 ("Session") and above, Nestar developed their own client-server protocols

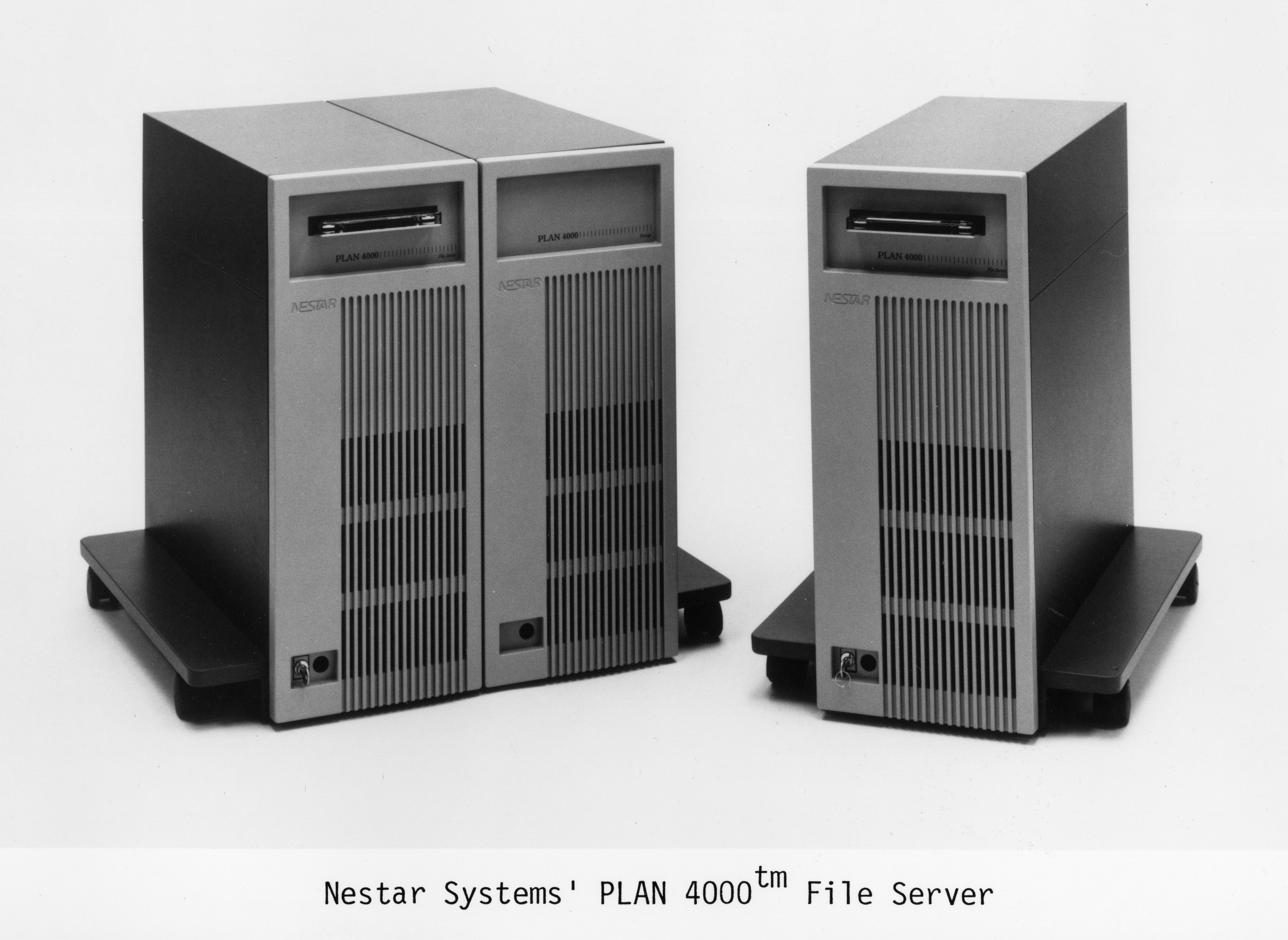
PLAN 4000 file server

The first file server in the PLAN series was the PLAN 4000, delivered at the end of 1982. It was a 26" high floor-standing unit with one processor cabinet that contained an optional 60 MB 8" hard disk, and up to three attached storage cabinets containing a 137 MB 14" hard disk. The processor was a version of the Sun Microsystems 8Mhz 256KB Motorola 68000 Multibus microprocessor board, which had been licensed to Codata and other manufacturers. The client nodes could be any combination of Apple II computers running Apple DOS, UCSD Pascal, or CP/M, and IBM PCs running PC DOS or UCSD Pascal.

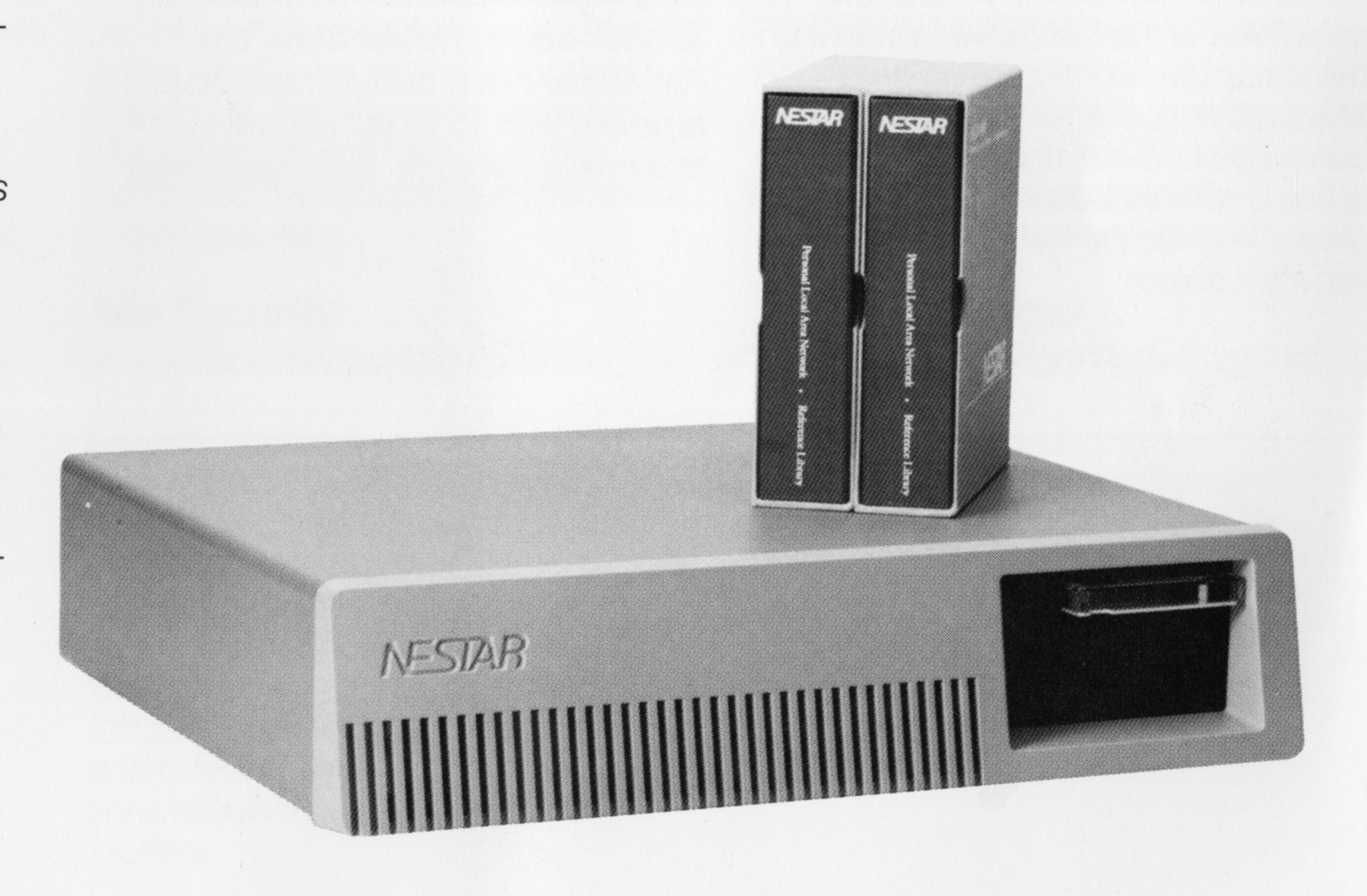
PLAN 3000 file server

PLAN 3000 was a desktop file server with a Motorola 68008 processor, a 5 1/4" hard disk with capacity of 24,40, or 56 MB, and a backup tape unit for 45 or 60 MB streaming tape cartridges.

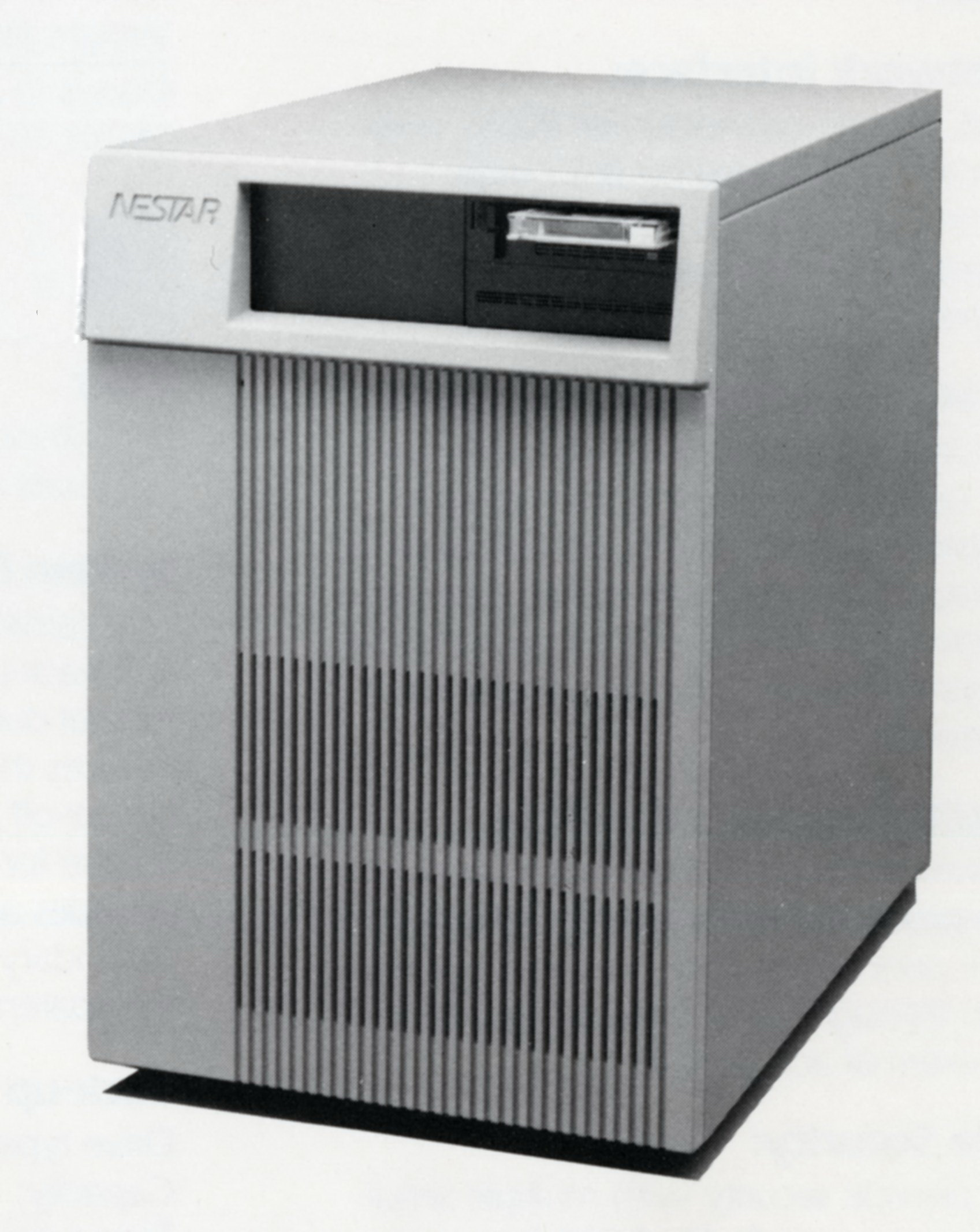
PLAN 5000 file server

PLAN 5000 was a floor-standing unit that had one or two 8" hard disks with a total capacity of 289, 578, 867, or 1156 MB, and a backup tape drive for 60 MB streaming tape cartridges.

PLAN 1000 was a diskless desktop server used as a print server. It used a Motorola 68008 processor and booted over the network from any file server. Two printers with parallel interfaces and one printer with a serial interface could be connected simultaneously.

PLAN 2000 was a software package that allowed 2 to 4 IBM PCs to share the hard disk and printer of one of them. It was an entry-level system compatible with Nestar's larger systems with dedicated file servers.

Unlike the prior systems, Nestar advertised the PLAN Series primarily to corporations, who were increasingly adopting the IBM PC for desktop use. They also educated corporate executives generally about the new field of personal computer networks. Several papers were published giving technical details of the system design and implementation. The average sales price of the PLAN 3000 was $14,000, and of the PLAN 4000, $24,000.

The PLAN system was reviewed in many trade press articles. PC Magazine said "When Nestar System builds a network, it doesn't fool around...Nestar has clearly done its homework in designing the PLAN 4000". In a later article they said of the PLAN 4000 file server, "In its sober gray vertical cabinet, it looks for all the world like a trash compactor. Inside, however, beats a heart of the purest silicon...Our impression of the Nestar is one of quality—albeit expensive—workmanship and high performance." They praised even small features: "The speaker on the PC 'ticks' to indicate that communication is occurring between your PC and the file server; so, even in lengthy data transfers, you know that something is happening." PC Tech Journal called it "The grandfather of local area networks for the PC" and said "PLAN 4000 is well endowed with software that makes the network a truly useful tool...it is clear that PLAN 4000 has taken a big step toward bringing maturity to the IBM PC local networking market". Corporate Times said Nestar is "Leading the Networking Systems Pack".

Competitors for some aspects of Nestar's PLAN series included Corvus Systems, Novell, 3Com, and Ungerman-Bass.

=== Other products ===
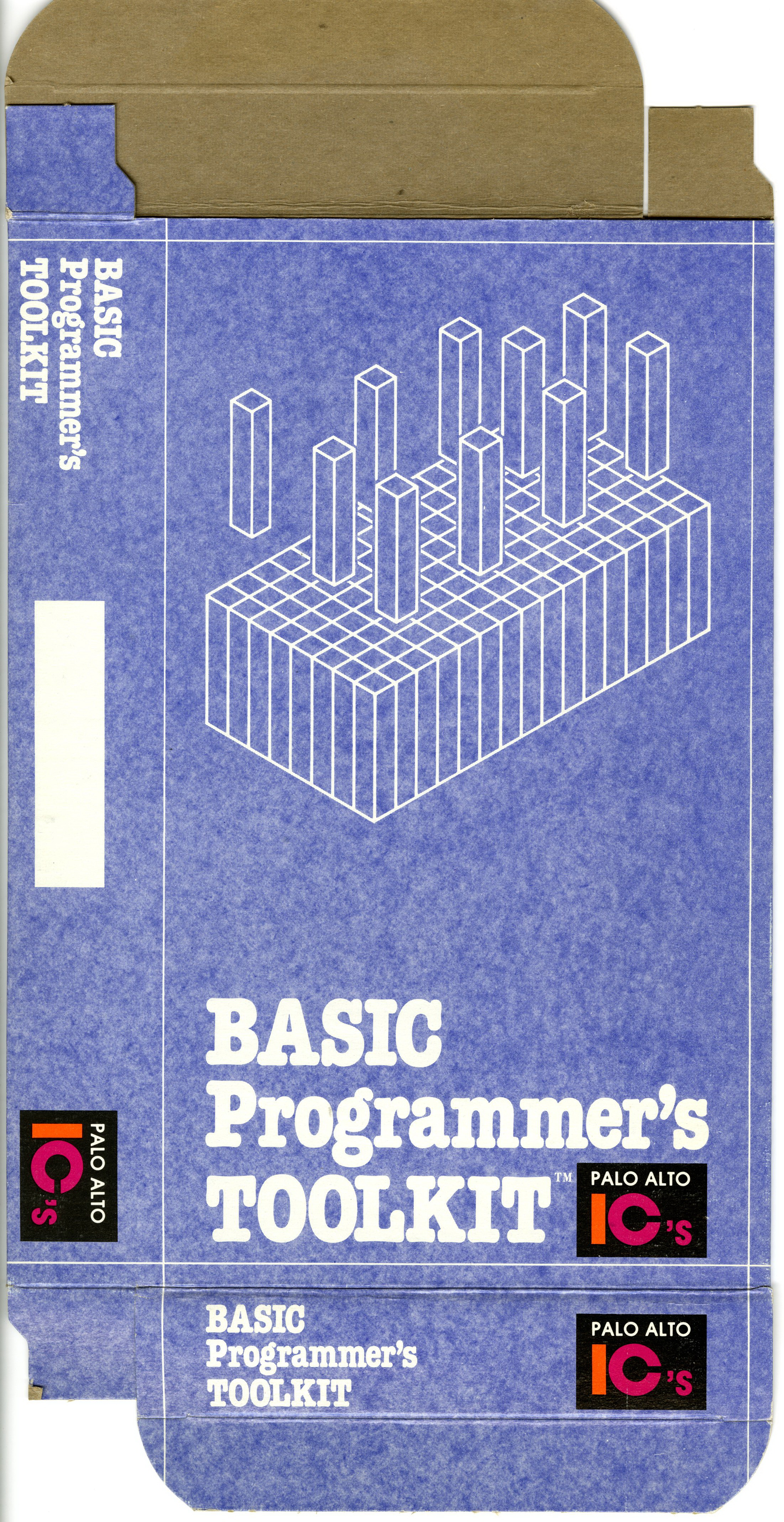
BASIC Programmer's Toolkit box

In August 1979 a wholly owned subsidiary of Nestar called "Palo Alto IC's" released the "BASIC Programmer's Toolkit", a collection of programming aids for the Commodore PET computer distributed as a hardware read-only-memory (ROM). The Toolkit was packaged for retail distribution and was sold internationally through dealers. It was favorably reviewed ("...may change your life") in trade magazines and newsletters. The Toolkit became extremely popular, and in the first six months there were over a million dollars in retail sales, which attracted the production of unauthorized copies by counterfeiters.

Written by Chuck Bond, the original source code for the Toolkit has been lost. In 2008 Chuck reconstructed the source code from a disassembly of the ROM.

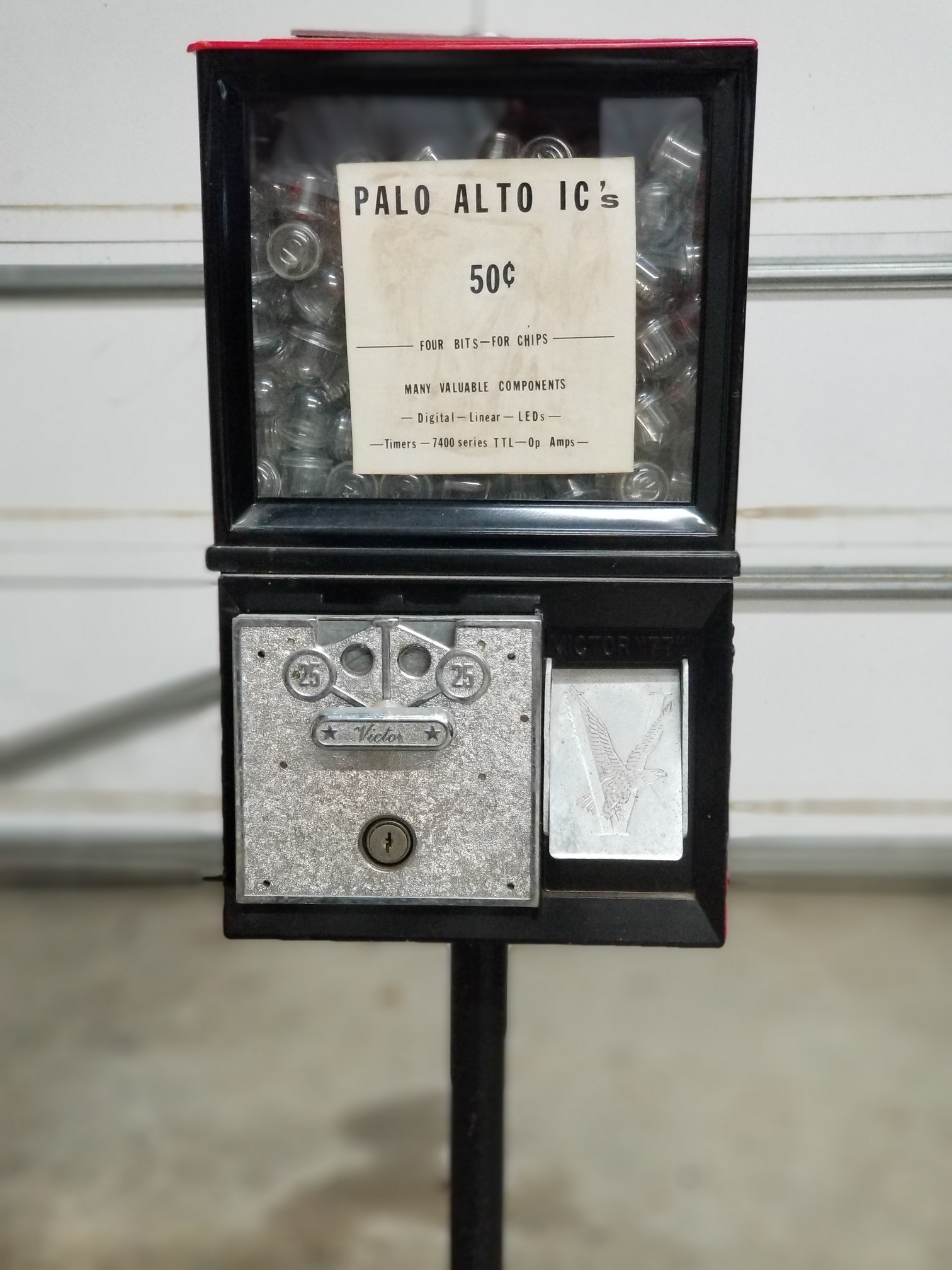

The only other offering of Palo Alto IC's was a vending machine that was installed in the Palo Alto Byte Shop computer store. It dispensed a random integrated circuit chip in a plastic container for 50 cents. It is unclear whether any of the ICs were ever purchased.
