= Len Shustek =

American computer scientist

Professor Leonard Jay Shustek
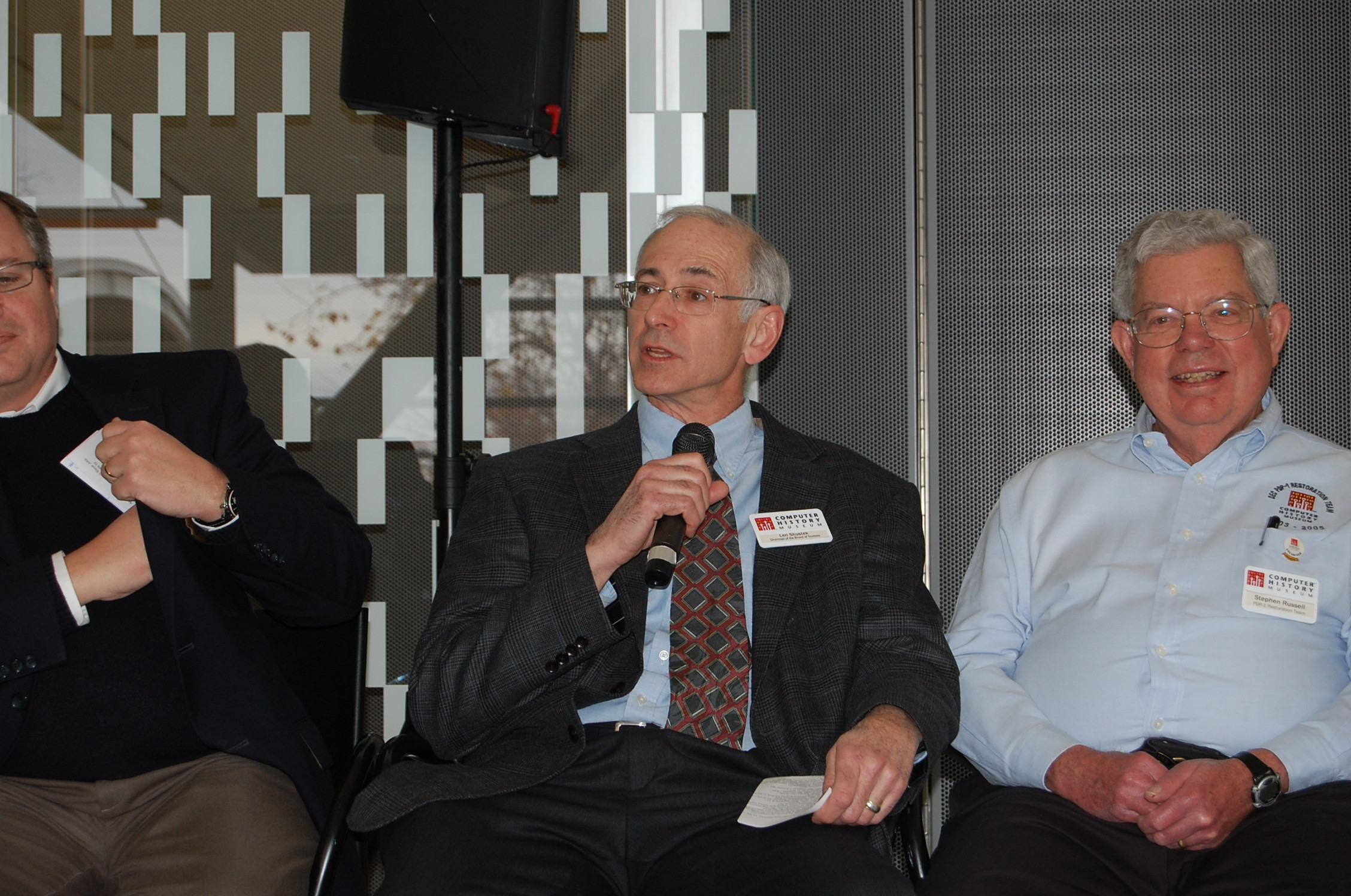
- Len Shustek (center) 2011
- Citizenship: United States
- Education: PhD, Stanford University
- Alma mater: Polytechnic Institute of New York University
- Occupation: Occasional Consulting Professor
- Employer: Stanford University
- Board member of: Computer History Museum, Polytechnic Institute, Tablus (Technical Advisory Board)
- Spouse: Donna Dubinsky

Leonard Jay "Len" Shustek is a founder of networking companies Nestar Systems and Network General and a former chairman of the board of trustees of the Computer History Museum located in Mountain View, California.

== Background and career ==
Shustek received BS and MS from Polytechnic Institute of New York University in Brooklyn, New York. After earning his PhD from Stanford University, he became an assistant professor of computer science at Carnegie Mellon University. After leaving the faculty, he co-founded Nestar Systems in 1979, and Network General in 1986. In 2003, he provided a $2.5 million endowment for the "Leonard J. Shustek Distinguished Professor of Computer Science Chair" at Polytechnic Institute of New York University. He has also taught computer science at Stanford University.

In 1972, Shustek proposed using microcode for evaluating the performance of computer systems. He received BS and MS from Polytechnic University in Brooklyn.

In a 1999 interview, Shustek reflected upon the failure of major computer suppliers decades earlier to recognize the need for computer networks. According to Shustek, computer scientist Harry Saal resigned his position at IBM Santa Teresa Laboratory, because he could not convince IBM to develop local area networks. Saal then convinced Shustek to give up his position as an associate professor at Carnegie Mellon, and together they founded the networking company Nestar.
