= Kemp Technologies =

American technology company

Progress Kemp
- Type: Public
- Industry: Technology
- Founded: 1 November 2000; 26 years ago
- Headquarters: 15 Wayside Rd, Suite 400, Burlington, MA, U.S. 01803
- Key people: Ray Downes (CEO)
- Products: Cloud load balancing Application delivery controller Load balancing
- Brands: LoadMaster
- Owner: Progress Software
- Website: kemptechnologies.com

Kemp, Inc. is an American technology company that was founded in 2000 in Bethpage, New York. The company builds load balancing products which balances user traffic between multiple application servers in a physical, virtual or cloud environment. After acquiring Flomon Networks, their products includes network performance monitoring tools.

Its first oversea office was opened in Limerick, Ireland before expanding to worldwide.

== History ==
In 2019, Kemp was acquired by private equity firm Mill Point Capital.

In November 2020, Kemp Technologies acquired Flowmon Networks for predictive network performance monitoring and network detection response.

In November 2021, Kemp was acquired by Progress Software for $258 million.
