= OSSIM =

Security information and event management system

LevelBlue OSSIM (Retired)
- Original authors: Dominique Karg, Julio Casal, Ignacio Cabrera and Alberto Román
- Developer: LevelBlue
- Stable release: 5.8.11 / May 10, 2022
- Operating system: Linux
- Type: Security / SIEM
- License: GNU General Public License
- Website: levelblue.com

OSSIM (Open Source Security Information Management) was formerly an open source security information and event management system, integrating a selection of tools designed to aid network administrators in computer security, intrusion detection and prevention.

In December, 2024, LevelBlue announced OSSIM is being retired.

The project began in 2003 as a collaboration between Dominique Karg, Julio Casal and later Alberto Román. In 2008 it became the basis for their company AlienVault. Following the acquisition of the Eureka project label and completion of R&D, AlienVault began selling a commercial derivative of OSSIM ('AlienVault Unified Security Management'). AlienVault was acquired by AT&T Communications and renamed AT&T Cybersecurity in 2018. In 2024, cybersecurity investor WillJam Ventures officially launched LevelBlue, a joint venture with AT&T, to form a new, standalone managed cybersecurity services business.

OSSIM had four major-version releases since its creation. An information visualization of the contributions to the source code for OSSIM was published at 8 years of OSSIM. The project has approximately 7.4 million lines of code. The current version of OSSIM is 5.7.5 and was released on September 16, 2019. Information about this release and past versions can be found here

As a SIEM system, OSSIM was intended to give security analysts and administrators a more complete view of all the security-related aspects of their system, by combining log management which can be extended with plugins and asset management and discovery with information from dedicated information security controls and detection systems. This information was then correlated together to create contexts to the information not visible from one piece alone. Alarm and availability views along with reporting capabilities are provided to enhance the capabilities of the tool and its utility to the security and systems engineers.

OSSIM performed these functions using other well-known open-source software security components, unifying them under a single browser-based user interface. The interface provided graphical analysis tools for information collected from the underlying open source software component (many of which are command line only tools that otherwise log only to a plain text file) and allowed centralized management of configuration options.

The software was distributed freely under the GNU General Public License. Unlike the individual components which may be installed onto an existing system, OSSIM was distributed as an installable ISO image designed to be deployed to a physical or virtual host as the core operating system of the host. OSSIM was built using Debian as its underlying operating system. Due to this core platform being open additional components abilities could be added and extended by the security administrators using standard packages and scripting as needed.

== Components ==
OSSIM featured the following software components:

- PRADS, used to identify hosts and services by passively monitoring network traffic. Added in release v4.0.
- Snort, used as an Intrusion detection system (IDS), and also used for cross correlation with OpenVAS.
- Suricata, used as an Intrusion detection system (IDS), as of version 4.2 this is the IDS used in the default configuration
- Tcptrack, used for session data information which can grant useful information for attack correlation.
- Munin, for traffic analysis and service watchdogging.
- NFSen/NFDump, used to collect and analyze NetFlow information.
- FProbe, used to generate NetFlow data from captured traffic.
- Nagios, used to monitor hosts and specified ports for asset availability a well as full local system Monitoring.
- OpenVas, used for vulnerability assessment and associated to assets.
- OSSIM also included self developed tools, the most important being a generic correlation engine with logical directive support and logs integration with plugins.

== Deprecated Components ==
- Arpwatch, used for MAC address anomaly detection, replaced by PRADS.
- P0f, used for passive OS detection and OS change analysis, replaced by PRADS.
- PADS, used for service anomaly detection, replaced by PRADS.
- Ntop, for recording traffic patterns between hosts and host groups, and statistics on protocol usage, deprecated.

== LevelBlue Labs Open Threat Exchange ==
LevelBlue maintains a crowd-sourced service for IP reputation information. It was launched in 2012

LevelBlue Open Threat Exchange (OTX) is an open threat sharing platform having a global community of over 450,000 participants from 140 countries contributing threat indicators daily.

It enables collaborative research and can integrate with a security stack to strengthen defenses with enriched threat intelligence, including millions of enriched indicators of compromise (IoCs) and details on threat groups, their infrastructure, and TTPs they are using.

== See also ==
- Software release life cycle
