= Flowmon Networks =

Czech information technology company

- Flowmon Networks logo
- Company type: Private
- Industry: Information Technology Services
- Founded: June 2007
- Headquarters: Burlington, Massachusetts
- Products: Network Monitoring, Application Performance Monitoring, Network Security, Network Detection & Response, Application performance management
- Website: www.flowmon.com

Flowmon Networks is a privately held technology company which develops network performance monitoring and network security products utilizing information from traffic flow. Its Flowmon product series consists of network monitoring probes, collectors for flow data (NetFlow, IPFIX and other standards) analysis and software modules which extend probes and collectors by analytical features for network behavior anomaly detection, network awareness application performance management, DDoS detection and mitigation and traffic recording.

== History ==
The origins of the company dated back to 2002, when a group of scientists under the CESNET association started activities in the field of programmable hardware called Liberouter project. When participating on the development project for GEANT2, the Liberouter team developed a prototype of network monitoring probe called FlowMon. It became the basis of Invea-Tech company which was founded in 2007 as a spin-off company by Masaryk University, Brno University of Technology and UNIS company on the base of the technology transfer from CESNET association. With this prototype of network monitoring solution it was incubated as a start-up by the South Moravian Innovation Centre technology incubator programme.

To strengthen its position on the NBA market, Invea-Tech acquired another Czech company called AdvaICT specialized in network behavior analysis.

In 2014, the company was recognized as one of the fastest growing technology companies in CE region by Deloitte. In 2015, Invea-Tech was split into Flowmon Networks and Netcope Technologies.

In January 2016 the company purchased FerretApps company to supplement its application monitoring solution.

In November 2020, Flowmon Networks was acquired by Kemp Technologies to enable "early detection of advanced threats and network anomalies along with complete active feedback loops for remediation."

In September 2021, Progress announced the acquisition of Kemp and, with it, the Flowmon Network Visibility solution, which is now marketed as part of the Progress product portfolio.

== Research Activities ==
Since the beginning, the company has participated in international research and development project focused on developing new measurement, analysis and data protection techniques across networks, i.e. DEMONS and ACEMIND. Flowmon also cooperates on local R&D projects with CESNET, Liberouter and Masaryk University endorsed by the funds of Technology Agency of the Czech Republic.
