= Sysload Software =

- Company type: Private
- Industry: Information technology management
- Founded: 1999
- Headquarters: La Défense, France
- Products: Performance management and monitoring software
- Website: www.orsyp.com

Sysload Software, was a computer software company specializing in systems measurement, performance and capacity management solutions for servers and data centers, based in Créteil, France. It has been acquired in September 2009 by ORSYP, a computer software company specialist in workload scheduling and IT Operations Management, based in La Défense, France.

== History ==
Sysload was created in 1999 as a result of the split of Groupe Loan System into two distinct entities: Loan Solutions, a developer of financial software and Sysload Software, a developer of performance management and monitoring software.

As of March 31, 2022, all Sysload products are in end of life.

== Products ==
The following products are developed by Sysload:

SP Analyst
Is a performance and diagnostic solution for physical and virtual servers. It is a productivity tool destined to IT teams to diagnose performance problems and manage server resource capacity.
SP Monitor
A monitoring solution for incident management and IT service availability. It aims at providing real-time management of IT infrastructure events while correlating them to business processes. SP Monitor receives and stores event data, makes correlations and groups them within customizable views which can be accessed via an ordinary web browser.
SP Portal
A capacity and performance reporting solution for servers and data centers to allow IT managers analyze server resource allocation within information systems.

Sysload products are based on a 3-tiered (user interfaces, management modules and collection and analysis modules) architecture metric collection technology that provides detailed information on large and complex environments. Sysload software products are available for various virtualized and physical platforms including: VMware, Windows, AIX, HP-UX, Solaris, Linux, IBM i, PowerVM, etc.
