= Network Security Toolkit =

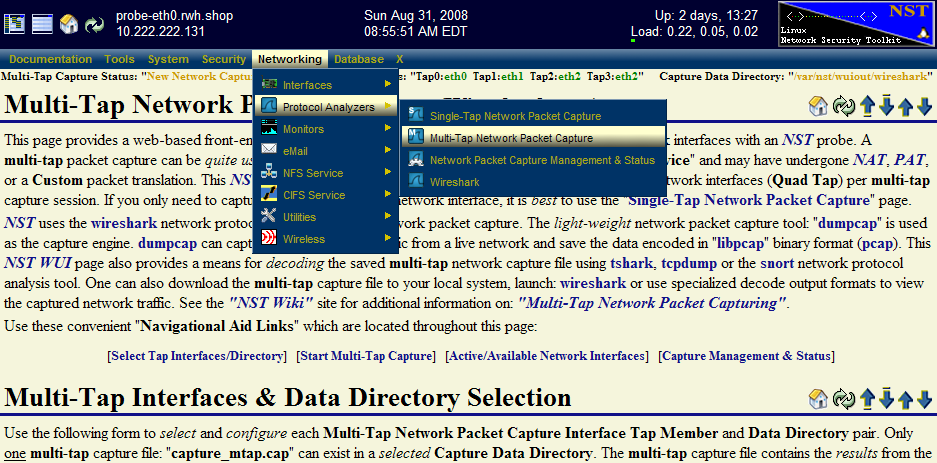
- NST WUI: Multi-Tap Network Packet Capture
- Developers: Ronald W. Henderson; Paul Blankenbaker
- Release: 2003; 23 years ago
- Stable release: 44-15105 / May 31, 2026; 2 months ago
- Written in: HTML, JavaScript, AJAX, JSON, Bash, PHP, Java, Perl, Python, XML, XSLT, SVG, C, C++, Expect, Unix Utilities
- Operating system: Linux
- License: GNU General Public License 2.0 (GPLv2)
- Website: networksecuritytoolkit.org

Network Security Toolkit (NST) is a Linux-based Live DVD/USB Flash Drive that provides a set of free and open-source computer security and networking tools to perform routine security and networking diagnostic and monitoring tasks. The distribution can be used as a network security analysis, validation and monitoring tool on servers hosting virtual machines. The majority of tools published in the article "Top 125 security tools" by Insecure.org are available in the toolkit. NST has package management capabilities similar to Fedora and maintains its own repository of additional packages.

== Features ==
Many tasks that can be performed within NST are available through a web interface called NST WUI. Among the tools that can be used through this interface are nmap with the vizualization tool ZenMap, ntop, a Network Interface Bandwidth Monitor, a Network Segment ARP Scanner, a session manager for VNC, a minicom-based terminal server, serial port monitoring, and WPA PSK management.

Other features include visualization of ntopng, ntop, wireshark, traceroute, NetFlow and kismet data by geolocating the host addresses, IPv4 Address conversation, traceroute data and wireless access points and displaying them via Google Earth or a Mercator World Map bit image, a browser-based packet capture and protocol analysis system capable of monitoring up to four network interfaces using Wireshark, as well as a Snort-based intrusion detection system with a "collector" backend that stores incidents in a MySQL database. For web developers, there is also a JavaScript console with a built-in object library with functions that aid the development of dynamic web pages.

=== Host Geolocations ===
The following example ntop host geolocation images were generated by NST.

=== Network Monitors ===
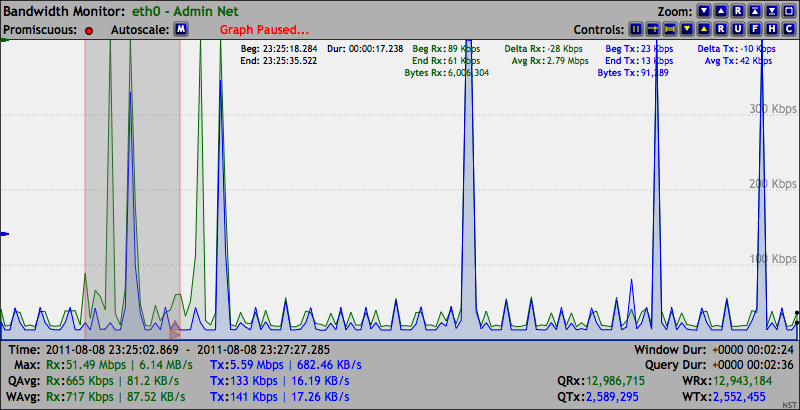
Network Interface Bandwidth Monitor - Interface: eth0

The following image depicts the interactive dynamic SVG/AJAX enabled Network Interface Bandwidth Monitor which is integrated into the NST WUI. Also shown is a Ruler Measurement tool overlay to perform time and bandwidth rate analysis.

== See also ==
- BackTrack
- Kali Linux
- List of digital forensic tools
- Computer Security
- List of live CDs
