= MX5 =

MX5 may refer to:

- Mazda MX-5, a roadster sports car
- Dongfeng Fengdu MX5, a compact crossover sport utility vehicle
- Meizu MX5, a smartphone
- MX5, an Ethernet router in the Juniper MX-Series
- MX-5, a lunar lander design from Moon Express
