= VMX =

VMX may refer to:

== Computing ==
- Virtual Machine Extensions, instructions on processors with x86 virtualization
- AltiVec, a floating point and integer SIMD instruction set called VMX by IBM
- vMX 3D, an Ethernet router in the Juniper MX-Series by Juniper Networks
- .vmx, a filename extension for virtual machine configuration files used by VMware

== Other uses ==
- Vintage motocross
- VMX (Voice Message Exchange), a voicemail company
- VMX (streaming service), also known as Vivamax, an online streaming service in the Philippines
