= Lastline =

American cyber security company

Lastline, Inc.
- Type: Private
- Founded: 2011
- Headquarters: Redwood City, California, United States
- Area served: United States, Canada, Europe, Middle East
- Key people: John DiLullo (CEO)
- Products: Network security products
- Website: Lastline.com

Lastline, Inc. is an American cyber security company and breach detection platform provider based in Redwood City, California. The company offers network-based security breach detection and other security services that combat malware used by advanced persistent threat (APT) groups for businesses, government organizations and other security service providers. Lastline has offices in North America, Europe, and Asia.

== History ==
Lastline was founded in 2011 by University of California, Santa Barbara and Northeastern University researchers Engin Kirda, Christopher Kruegel and Giovanni Vigna. In 2014, WatchGuard Technologies, Inc. joined the Lastline Defense Program to combat advanced malware targeting businesses by providing primary functionality for APT blocking, available on their unified threat management (UTM) and next generation firewall (NGFW) products. WatchGuard utilizes Lastline's next generation cloud-based sandbox, powered by full-system emulation, which inspects objects for unknown malware crafted to evade detection.

Lastline was featured at the 2014 RSA Conference in San Francisco. That same year, Giovanni Vigna, CTO at Lastline, appeared at the Cyber Security Expo in a keynote presentation that analyzed evasive malware techniques.

Juniper Networks began integrating with Lastline to expand the capability of its Spotlight Secure platform in 2014. In February 2015, Lastline announced a partnership and technology integration with Carbon Black in an effort to facilitate automated and comprehensive end-to-end endpoint and network security for email, web, files and mobile applications.

== Funding ==
In 2013, Lastline raised $10 million in funding led by venture capital firms Redpoint Ventures and E.ventures, now known as Headline Redpoint Ventures led the Series B round with a $9 million investment, while existing investor E.ventures provided the remainder.

In 2014, Lastline raised $10 million from new investors Dell Ventures and Presidio Ventures, as well as existing investors Redpoint Ventures and E.ventures. With the new round of funding, Lastline will continue to focus on serving its growing global enterprise customer base as well as new and existing partnerships to improve information security and threat intelligence worldwide. This round of funding adds to the $13.7 million raised in earlier rounds to bring total funding raised to nearly $24 million since the company's founding in 2011.

On June 4, 2020 Lastline announced that they entered into a definitive agreement to be acquired by VMware. The acquisition was expected to be finalized by July 31, 2020.

After the acquisition of VMware by Broadcom, Lastline is now part of Broadcom.

== Lastline Labs ==
From May 2013 to May 2014, Lastline researchers studied hundreds of thousands of malware samples, testing new malware against 47 vendors’ AV signatures featured in VirusTotal to determine which caught the malware samples, and how quickly. They found that, on any given day, at least half of the AV scanners it tested failed to detect new malware and after two months, a third of the scanners were still not detecting it.

== See also ==
- Computer security
- Countermeasure (computer)
- IT risk
- Malware
- Network Behavior Anomaly Detection
- Threat (computer)
