= Eureka (organisation) =

Intergovernmental organisation for research and development funding

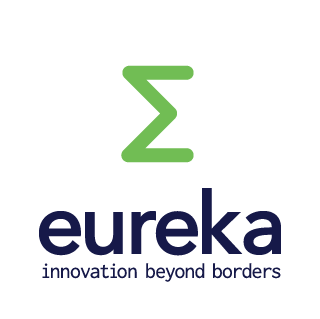
- Founded: 17 July 1985; 41 years ago
- Type: Intergovernmental organisation
- Purpose: Market R&D support, innovation policy, science & technology
- Location: Eureka Secretariat, Brussels, Belgium
- Region served: Greater Europe, World
- Members: 43 members; 4 associated members
- Key people: (Portugal) Ricardo Conde (Eureka Chairperson)
- Website: www.eurekanetwork.org

Eureka (often abbreviated as E!, or Σ!) is an intergovernmental organisation for research and development funding and coordination. Eureka is an open platform for international cooperation in innovation. Organisations and companies applying through Eureka programmes can access funding and support from national and regional ministries or agencies for their international R&D projects.

As of June 2022, Eureka consisted of 43 full members, including the European Union (represented by the European Commission) and four associated members (Argentina, Chile, South Africa, and Singapore). All 27 EU Member States are also members of Eureka. Eureka has full members from non-European countries such as Canada, South Korea, and Israel.

Eureka is not an EU research programme, but rather an intergovernmental organisation of national ministries or agencies, of which the EU is a member. Cooperation and synergy are sought between Eureka and the research activities of the EU proper, such as with the European Union's Horizon 2020 and the European Research Area.

== History ==
Founded in 1985 by prominent European political figures, Eureka has grown to one of the longest running European organisations dedicated to the financing of joint European R&D projects. Before, in 1954 Eureka Brussels was founded. For decades the biggest platform for proprietary technologies with more than 500 inventors of 40 till 60 countries and in average per year (Info: at Expo Center or Place de Rogier at Brussels Pyramid exhibition center) around 1,200 inventions. This platform was active till 2017. In 2018 Eureka Brussels was preparing itself for the 3rd millennium with updates in different fields: Technology Fund - Market Implementation of Inventions i.e. Waterdesalination via ACS Holding Tech. LTD - 2 Syndicates in the field of credit rankings i.e. ERA European Rating Agency and ARA African Rating Agency. Still the HQ is in Belgium; and previous head of International Jury is acting as 3rd President, Mr. Guy Van der Beken. (Info: www.eureka-hq.net).

=== Foundation ===
Eureka was established with the "Paris Declaration" of 17 July 1985, and its principles are based on the later Hannover Declaration, subscribed by Ministers on 5 November 1985. The two main founders were former heads of states, François Mitterrand (France) and Helmut Kohl (Germany). Other important personalities involved were Hubert Curien, French ex-Minister of research and former chairman of the European Space Agency, and Jacques Attali, adviser to François Mitterrand.

Briefly, it is about assuring the technological independence of Europe in the key domains of the future; encouraging, wherever possible, co-operation between European businesses and researchers; mobilising the necessary financial resources; accompanying the efforts of our enterprises by creating the necessary environment and supporting the unification of our internal markets.

There are numerous obstacles. Once the initial idea of Eureka was formulated, we were able to foresee the difficulties to be faced. But we know that each time we come together — for example to address high-energy physics, research into nuclear fusion, the development of an integrated space programme or the construction of crucial scientific equipment — our successes encourage us in the idea that we can work together in R&D areas close to industrial markets, despite the problems arising from the normal and legitimate competition between firms. François Mitterrand, Paris, 17 July 1985.

== Structure ==
=== Chairs ===
Before 1989, Eureka chairmanship changed hands every six months. Since then, the chairmanship rotates every 1 July, for a period of one year.

Year	Countries
1985, 2nd semester	France
1986, 1st semester	Germany
1986, 2nd semester	United Kingdom
1987, 1st semester	Sweden
1987, 2nd semester	Spain
1988, 1st semester	Denmark
1988, 2nd semester	Austria
1989–1990	Italy
1990–1991	Netherlands
1991–1992	Finland
1992–1993	France
1993–1994	Norway
1994–1995	Switzerland
1995–1996	Belgium
1996–1997	United Kingdom
1997–1998	Portugal
1998–1999	Turkey
1999–2000	Germany
2000–2001	Spain
2001–2002	Greece
2002–2003	Denmark
2003–2004	France
2004–2005	Netherlands
2005–2006	Czech Republic
2006–2007	Italy
2007–2008	Slovenia
2008–2009	Portugal
2009–2010	Germany
2010–2011	Israel
2011–2012	Hungary
2012–2013	Turkey
2013–2014	Norway
2014–2015	Switzerland
2015–2016	Sweden
2016–2017	Spain
2017–2018	Finland
2018–2019	United Kingdom
2019–2020	Netherlands
2020–2021	Austria
2021–2022	Portugal
2023–2024	Turkey
2024–2025	Germany; Canada
2025–2026	Switzerland

== Membership ==
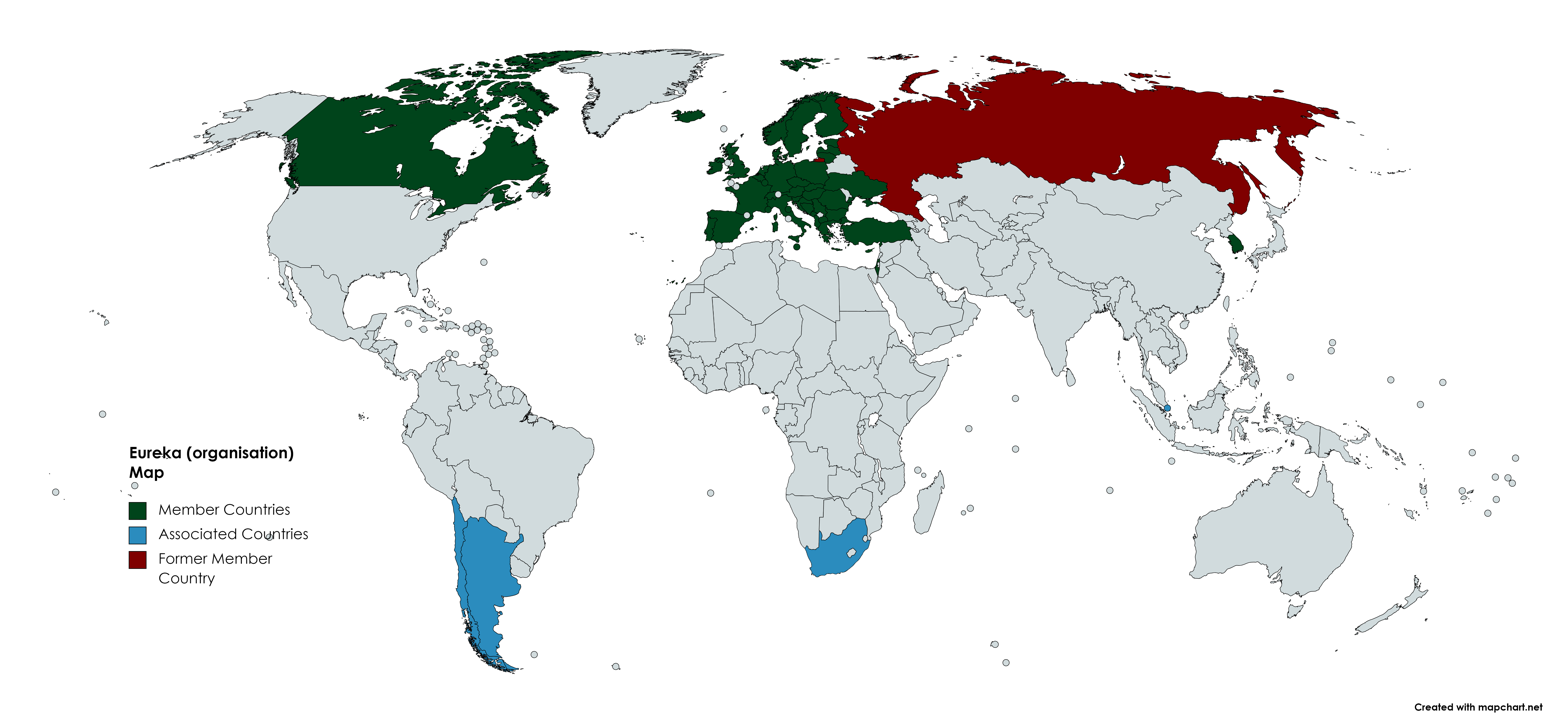
Eureka organisation Map

Member country	Joined
Albania	1991
Austria	1985
Belgium	1985
Bosnia and Herzegovina	2009
Bulgaria	2010
Canada	2012
Croatia	2000
Cyprus	2002
Czech Republic	1995
Denmark	1985
Estonia	2001
Finland	1985
France	1985
Germany	1985
Greece	1985
Hungary	1992
Iceland	1986
Ireland	1985
Israel	2000
Italy	1985
Latvia	2000
Lithuania	1999
Luxembourg	1985
Malta	2006
Monaco	2005
Montenegro	2012
Netherlands	1985
North Macedonia	2008
Norway	1985
Poland	1995
Portugal	1985
Romania	1997
Russia	1993 (Note: Left in 2023)
San Marino	2005
Serbia	2002
Slovakia	2001
Slovenia	1994
South Korea	2009
Spain	1985
Sweden	1985
Switzerland	1985
Turkey	1985
Ukraine	2006
United Kingdom	1985
European Union	1985

Associated Countries	Joined
Argentina	2019
South Africa	2014
Chile	2017
Singapore	2021

== Significant projects ==
Eureka projects are numbered, preceded by 'E! '.

- E! 45 helped to fund the Prometheus project for safer road vehicles, such as through autonomous driving with 745 million euros.
- E! 95 was a 730 million euros HDTV project, which created the HD-MAC standard for high definition television.
- E! 147 was a 93 million euros digital audio broadcasting project whose technologies went into Musicam, and which was used as the basis for MPEG-1 Layer II (MP2) and used in DAB (Digital Audio Broadcast), and ASPEC (Adaptive Spectral Perceptual Entropy Coding), which was used in a modified form in MP3 audio.
- E! 127 paid 3.8bn euros into the JESSI project (Joint European Submicron Silicon Initiative) whose goal was to regain ground lost to Asia and the US in microchips.
- E! 2551 cost 6.1 million euros for the integration of existing CAD/CAM programs under a common user interface, part of which was paid to Vero Software.
- E! 3674 is Information Technology for European Advancement (ITEA2), an industry-driven cooperative R&D programme for maintaining European leadership in software-intensive systems, with the project due to end in January 2014 having received 3.0bn euros. ITEA2 Projects notably include WellCom, OSAMI-E (Open Source AMbient Intelligence), and Easy Interactions.
- E! 4986 AlienVault developed a security software called OSSIM (Open Source Security Information Management) that is now not only a reference in the field but also an essential component in modern cyber-wars. E! 4986 received 1.2 million euros.
- E! 3728 OMIM (MIMO) invented a new method of medical waste disposal. MIMO is safe for the environment and treats infectious waste by applying a combination of heat and pressure. This is an alternative to incineration methods that use fossil fuels. The project was an initiative between Spain, Portugal, and Morocco. E! 3728 received 0.37 million euros.

== Programmes ==
The Eureka annual report describes the following programmes:

Eurostars

Eurostars is Eureka's flagship SME funding programme that supports R&D-performing SMEs (alongside other types of organisations) leading international project consortia. It is co-funded by 36 participating Eureka national funding bodies and the European Union Horizon 2020 framework programme.

Clusters

Clusters are long-term, strategically significant industrial initiatives. They usually have a large number of participants, and aim to develop inclusive technologies of importance for European competitiveness mainly in ICT, energy and more recently in the biotechnology and automation sectors. Eureka Clusters are known to have had a particular impact on the ability of the European microelectronics sector to compete with other continents.

Eureka Clusters are:

- CELTIC NEXT: Telecommunications
- EURIPIDES: Electronic packaging and smart systems
- ITEA 3: Software-intensive systems
- PENTA: Micro and nanoelectronics enabled systems and applications
- EUROGIA2020: Low-carbon energy technologies
- METALLURGY EUROPE: New metals
- SMART: Advance manufacturing programme

Network projects

Network projects is a flexible funding programme for all organisations collaborating on international R&D projects. It is open for applications all year, but there are also country-specific calls for projects launched frequently. These are sometimes thematic and can be for bilateral or multilateral collaborations.

Globalstars

Globalstars follows the same programme model as Network projects. Calls for projects are launched between Eureka countries and one non-Eureka country. In recent years, national funding ministries/ agencies from several countries, including Brazil, India, Japan, and Singapore, have collaborated with Eureka using this programme.

InvestHorizon

InvestHorizon is the only Eureka programme that doesn't offer funding, but rather trainings, workshops and international events. It is a European Union-funded joint investment readiness programme in collaboration with Eureka that supports deep tech SMEs seeking Series A investment.

Umbrellas

Umbrellas no longer exist as Eureka programmes. Umbrellas were thematic networks within the Eureka framework focusing on a specific technology area or business sector. The main goal of an umbrella was to facilitate the generation of Eureka projects in its own target area.

Past Eureka Umbrellas:

- Eureka Tourism (ended 30.06.2012)
- Eureka build 2 (2010–2013)
- EuroAgri Foodchain (2009–2013)
- Pro-Factory (2007–2011)
- E! SURF (2010–2015)
- Eniwep (ended 1.2.2010)
- Eulasnet II (ended 31.5.2010)
- Logchain + (ended 21.2.2011)
