= ILB =

ILB may refer to:

- I Love Bees, an alternate reality game
- Inflation-linked bond, see inflation-indexed bond, a financial debt instrument
- Inside linebacker, a position in American football
- Inshore lifeboat, a type of lifeboat rescue vehicles
- Inbound load balancing, a form of network load balancing
- Irish Lighthouse Board, see Commissioners of Irish Lights
- internationales literaturfestival berlin, Berlin International Literature Festival
- "Intentionally left blank"
