= Ntop =

Free software to show network usage

- Developer: Luca Deri
- Stable release: 5.0.1 / 13 August 2012; 14 years ago
- Written in: C
- Platform: Cross-platform: Unix, Linux and Microsoft Windows
- Available in: English
- Type: Network analyzer
- License: GNU GPLv3
- Website: www.ntop.org

ntop is computer software that probes a computer network to show network use in a way similar to what the program top does for processes. Not to be confused with the CAD/CAE software nTop (formerly nTopology).

== Software ==
In interactive mode, it displays the network status on the user's terminal. In Web mode, it acts as a web server, creating a HTML dump of the network status. It supports a NetFlow-sFlow emitter-collector, a Hypertext Transfer Protocol (HTTP) based client interface for creating ntop-centric monitoring applications, and RRDtool (RRD) for persistently storing traffic statistics.

ntop is available for both Unix and Win32-based platforms. It has been developed by Luca Deri, an Italian research scientist and network manager at University of Pisa.

Common usage on a Linux system is to start the ntop daemon (/etc/init.d/ntopd start), then one can use the web interface to ntop via visiting http://127.0.0.1:3000 provided the loopback device has been started (/etc/init.d/net.lo start) and the listening port for ntop is 3000 (look out for the -w option in grep ntop).

== See also ==
- Netsniff-ng
- iftop
- ntopng
