= Eureka ITEA2 WellCom Project =

Collaborative research project, 2007–2009

The Eureka ITEA 2 WellCom was a collaborative research project running under the ITEA2 programme within the EUREKA framework. It was launched in April 2007 and ended in October 2009. The WellCom consortium was composed of 15 European organizations including Large companies, SMEs, research institutes and universities. The research effort is supported in part by the different European Public Authorities involved in the project.

== WellCom Partners ==
- Activa Multimedia,
- NXP Semiconductors
- Pace,
- Prewise,
- SES,
- Telenor,
- UNIK,
- University of Évry Val d'Essonne.

== Conference papers ==
1. S. Alam, J. Noll and D. Roman, "Semantic Policies for Service Access in Mobile supported Sensor Networks ", Int. Conf. on Advances in Human-oriented and Personalized Mechanisms, Technologies, and Services, I-CENTRIC 2008, October 26–31, 2008 - Sliema, Malta
2. E. Lehtihet, Z. Iqbal, N. Agoulmine, J. Noll, and T. Sund, "Integrating Internet Services in a Converged Home Environment ", Proc. of Wireless World Research Forum, WWRF #21, 13-15 Oct 2008, Stockholm
3. M. M. R. Chowdhury, S. Alam and J. Noll, "Policy Based Access for Home Contents and Services, Fifth International Conference on Soft Computing as Transdisciplinary Science and Technology, IEEE/ACM CSTST'08, October 26–30, 2008 - Cergy-Pontoise/Paris
4. M. M. R. Chowdhury, N. Elahi, S. Alam, J. Noll, "A Framework for Privacy in Social Communities ", Special Issue of International Journal of Web Based Communities (IJWBC), Inderscience Publishers, ISSN(online): 1741-8216 ISSN(print): 1477-8394.
5. J. Noll, S. Alam, and M. M. R. Chowdhury, "Integrating Mobile Devices into Semantic Services Environments" Fourth International Conference on Wireless and Mobile Communications, ICWMC 2008, July/August 2008, Athens, Greece
6. N. Elahi, M.M.R. Chowdhury, and J. Noll, "Relation-based Access Control through Semantic Rules ", Proceedings of WWRF #20, April 2008, Ottawa, Ontario, Canada
7. Najeeb Elahi, Mohammad M. R. Chowdhury, Josef Noll, "Semantic Access Control in Web Based Communities", In the proceedings of 3rd International Multi-Conference on Computing in the Global Information Technology ICCGI July/August, 2008 - Athens, Greece Published by IEEE CS press (IEEE Explore), ISBN 978-0-7695-3275-2
8. Gondi, Vamsi Krishna; Lehtihet, Elyes; Agoulmine, Nazim, "Ontology-Based Network Management in Seamless Roaming Architectures" In Network Operations and Management Symposium Workshops, 2008. NOMS Workshops 2008. IEEE7-11 April 2008 Page(s):60 - 65
9. Lehtihet, Elyes; Agoulmine, Nazim, "Towards Integrating Network Management Interfaces" In Network Operations and Management Symposium, 2008. NOMS 2008. 11th IEEE/IFIP 7–11 April 2008 Page(s):1–4
10. Nguyen-Vuong, Quoc-Thinh; Agoulmine, Nazim; Ghamri-Doudane, Yacine, "Novel Approach for Load Balancing in Heterogeneous Wireless Packet Networks" In Network Operations and Management Symposium Workshops, 2008. NOMS Workshops 2008. IEEE 7–11 April 2008 Page(s):26 - 31
11. L. Trappeniers, M. Godon, L. Claeys, O. Martinot, E. Marilly, "Cross-Media Experiences: Ambient Community Interactions in the Cit", published in the Bell Labs Technical Journal, v13-2–Summer 2008
