= Traffic flow (computer networking) =

Sequence of network packets from a source computer to a destination

In packet switching networks, traffic flow, packet flow or network flow is a sequence of packets from a source computer to a destination, which may be another host, a multicast group, or a broadcast domain. RFC 2722 defines traffic flow as "an artificial logical equivalent to a call or connection." RFC 3697 defines traffic flow as "a sequence of packets sent from a particular source to a particular unicast, anycast, or multicast destination that the source desires to label as a flow. A flow could consist of all packets in a specific transport connection or a media stream. However, a flow is not necessarily 1:1 mapped to a transport connection." Flow is also defined in RFC 3917 as "a set of IP packets passing an observation point in the network during a certain time interval." Packet flow temporal efficiency can be affected by one-way delay (OWD) that is described as a combination of the following components:

- Processing delay (the time taken to process a packet in a network node)
- Queuing delay (the time a packet waits in a queue until it can be transmitted)
- Transmission delay (the amount of time necessary to push all the packet into the wire)
- Propagation delay (amount of time it takes the signal’s header to travel from the sender to the receiver)

== Utility for network administration ==
Packets from one flow need to be handled differently from others, by means of separate queues in switches, routers and network adapters, to achieve traffic shaping, policing, fair queueing or quality of service. It is also a concept used in Queueing Network Analyzers (QNAs) or in packet tracing.

Applied to Internet routers, a flow may be a host-to-host communication path, or a socket-to-socket communication identified by a unique combination of source and destination addresses and port numbers, together with transport protocol (for example, UDP or TCP). In the TCP case, a flow may be a virtual circuit, also known as a virtual connection or a byte stream.

In packet switches, the flow may be identified by IEEE 802.1Q Virtual LAN tagging in Ethernet networks, or by a label-switched path in MPLS tag switching.

Packet flow can be represented as a path in a network to model network performance. For example, a water flow network can be used to conceptualize packet flow. Communication channels can be thought of as pipes, with the pipe capacity corresponding to bandwidth and flows corresponding to data throughput. This visualization can help to understand bottlenecks, queuing, and the unique requirements of tailored systems.

== See also ==
- Argus – Audit Record Generation and Utilization System
- Cisco NetFlow
- Dataflow (software engineering)
- Data stream
- Flow control
- IP Flow Information Export
- Stream (computing)
- Telecommunication circuit
- Traffic generation model
