= Juniper MX Series =

Ethernet routers

Juniper MX Series 3D
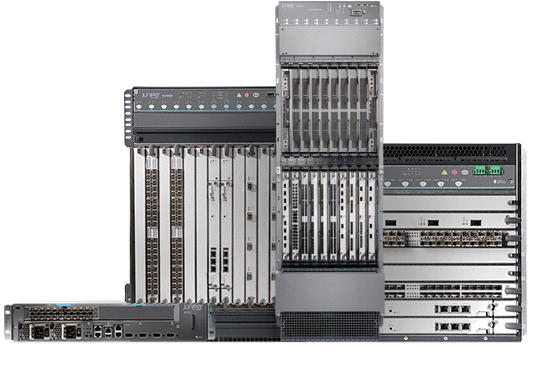
- Manufacturer: Juniper Networks
- Introduced: 2006
- Type: Routers and Switches
- Processor: Internet processor
- Dimensions: 1–45 rack space units

The Juniper MX Series is a family of ethernet routers and switches designed and manufactured by Juniper Networks. In 2006, Juniper released the first of the MX-series, the MX960, MX240, and MX480. The second generation routers, called MX "3D", were first released in 2009 and featured a new Trio chipset and IPv6 support. In 2013, the MX routers were improved to increase their bandwidth, and a virtualized MX 3D router, the vMX 3D, was released in 2014. Utilizing the Juniper Extension Toolkit (JET), third party software can be integrated into the routers.

== History ==
=== Early releases ===
On October 18, 2006, the MX Series was publicly announced. Before its release, Ethernet aggregation was a missing component of Juniper's edge network products, which was causing it to lose market-share to Alcatel. The MX Series was late to market, but it was well received by analysts and customers. It was part of a trend at-the-time to incorporate additional software features in routers and switches.

The first product release of the MX series was the MX960, a 14-slot, 480 Gbit/s switch and router. In late 2006, Juniper introduced the MX240 and MX480, which are smaller versions of the 960. They had a throughput of 240 Gbit/s and 480 Gbit/s respectively.

=== Further development ===
In 2009 a new line of MX "3D" products were introduced, using Juniper's programmable Trio chipset. Trio is a proprietary semiconductor technology with custom network instructions. It provides a cross between network processing units and ASICs. IPv6 features were added and the MX80, a smaller 80 Gbit/s router, was introduced the following year.

In 2011 new switch fabric cards increased the capacity of MX 3D routers. In May 2011 Juniper introduced several new products including the MX5, MX10 and MX40 3D routers, which have a throughput of 20, 40 and 60 Gbit/s respectively and can each be upgraded to an MX80. A collection of features called MobileNext was introduced in 2011 at Mobile World Congress, then discontinued in August 2013. According to Network World, it allowed MX 3D products to serve as a mobile "gateway, an authentication and management control plan for 2G/3G and LTE mobile packet cores and as a policy manager for subscriber management systems."

In October 2012, Juniper introduced the MX2020 and 2010 3D Universal Edge Routers, with throughputs of 80 Tbit/s and 40 Tbit/s respectively. Juniper also released a video caching system for the MX family and a suite of software applications that include parental control, firewall and traffic monitoring. New "Virtual Chassis" features allowed network operators to manage multiple boxes as though they were a single router or switch.

=== Recent developments ===
In 2013, Juniper introduced new line cards for the MX series and a new switch fabric module, intended to upgrade the MX series' for higher bandwidth needs and for software-defined networking applications. The capacity of the MX240, 480 and 960 were increased by double or more. A new Multiservice Modular Interface Card (MS-MIC) was incorporated that supports up to 9 Gbit/s for services like tunneling software.

In March 2013, Juniper released the EX9200 switch, which isn't part of the MX Series, but uses the same software and Trio chipset. A virtualized MX series 3D router, the vMX 3D, was introduced in November 2014. A suite of updates were announced in late 2015. New MPC line cards were introduced, which have a throughput of up to 1.6 Tbit/s. Simultaneously the Juniper Extension Toolkit (JET) was announced. JET is a programming interface for integrating third-party applications that automate provisioning, maintenance and other tasks. The Junos Telemetry Interface was also announced at the same time. It reports data to applications and other equipment to automate changes to the network in response to faults or in order optimize performance.

== Current products and specifications ==
According to Juniper's website, Juniper's current MX Series products include the following:

Router/Switch	Capacity (Gbps)	Size (rack units)
MX5	20 (upgradeable to 80)	2U
MX10	40 (upgradeable to 80)	2U
MX40	60 (upgradeable to 80)	2U
MX80	80	2U
MX104	80	3.5U
MX150	40	1U
MX204	800	1U
MX240	1,920	5U
MX304	4,800	2U
MX480	5,120	8U
MX960	9,920	16U
MX2008	40,000	24U
MX2010	40,000	34U
MX2020	80,000	45U
MX10003	2,400	3U
MX10008	19,200	13U
MX10016	38,400	21U
Virtual MX	160	N/A
