= Network security =

Control of access to computer networks

Network security is an umbrella term to describe security controls, policies, processes and practices adopted to prevent, detect and monitor unauthorized access, misuse, modification, or denial of a computer network and network-accessible resources. Network security involves the authorization of access to data in a network, which is controlled by the network administrator. Users choose or are assigned an ID and password or other authenticating information that allows them access to information and programs within their authority. Network security covers a variety of computer networks, both public and private, that are used in everyday jobs: conducting transactions and communications among businesses, government agencies and individuals. Networks can be private, such as within a company, and others which might be open to public access. Network security is involved in organizations, enterprises, and other types of institutions. It does as its title explains: it secures the network, as well as protecting and overseeing operations being done. The most common and simple way of protecting a network resource is by assigning it a unique name and a corresponding password.

== Network security concept ==
Network security starts with authentication, commonly with a username and a password. Since this requires just one detail authenticating the user name—i.e., the password—this is sometimes termed one-factor authentication. With two-factor authentication, something the user 'has' is also used (e.g., a security token or 'dongle', an ATM card, or a mobile phone); and with three-factor authentication, something the user 'is' is also used (e.g., a fingerprint or retinal scan).

Once authenticated, a firewall enforces access policies such as what services are allowed to be accessed by the network users. Though effective to prevent unauthorized access, this component may fail to check potentially harmful content such as computer worms or Trojans being transmitted over the network. Anti-virus software or an intrusion prevention system (IPS) help detect and inhibit the action of such malware. An anomaly-based intrusion detection system may also monitor the network like wireshark traffic and may be logged for audit purposes and for later high-level analysis. Newer systems combining unsupervised machine learning with full network traffic analysis can detect active network attackers from malicious insiders or targeted external attackers that have compromised a user machine or account.

Communication between two hosts using a network may be encrypted to maintain security and privacy.

Honeypots, essentially decoy network-accessible resources, may be deployed in a network as surveillance and early-warning tools, as the honeypots are not normally accessed for legitimate purposes. Honeypots are placed at a point in the network where they appear vulnerable and undefended, but they are actually isolated and monitored. Techniques used by the attackers that attempt to compromise these decoy resources are studied during and after an attack to keep an eye on new exploitation techniques. Such analysis may be used to further tighten security of the actual network being protected by the honeypot. A honeypot can also direct an attacker's attention away from legitimate servers. A honeypot encourages attackers to spend their time and energy on the decoy server while distracting their attention from the data on the real server. Similar to a honeypot, a honeynet is a network set up with intentional vulnerabilities. Its purpose is also to invite attacks so that the attacker's methods can be studied and that information can be used to increase network security. A honeynet typically contains one or more honeypots.

Previous research on network security was mostly about using tools to secure transactions and information flow, and how well users knew about and used these tools. However, more recently, the discussion has expanded to consider information security in the broader context of the digital economy and society. This is indicative of network security topics covering not just individual users and tools, but also conversations about the larger culture of information security in our digital world.

== Security management ==
Security management for networks is different for all kinds of situations. A home or small office may only require basic security while large businesses may require high-maintenance and advanced software and hardware to prevent malicious attacks from hacking and spamming. In order to minimize susceptibility to malicious attacks from external threats to the network, corporations often employ tools which carry out network security verifications. These tools can also mitigate and detect internal human behavior such as insider threats and email storms. The human element is often the weakest link in any network security system, as evidenced by a study in 2014 which found that employees often do not see themselves as part of their organization's information security effort and often take actions that impede organizational changes.

The move from centralized systems to cloud-based and hybrid work environments has made it harder to monitor networks, especially with traditional tools. A Broadcom survey found that 65% of respondents rely on third-party network providers, which creates blind spots and makes systems more vulnerable. Dependence on third parties also reduces an organization's direct control over its network infrastructure, making it harder to implement advanced monitoring processes.

=== Types of attack ===
Networks are subject to attacks from malicious sources. Attacks can be from one of two categories: passive and active.

A passive attack occurs when a malicious actor intercepts data traveling across a network, usually without generating any kind of alerts. It can be difficult or impossible to know if this kind of attack has occurred. For example, a wardriving attack can wirelessly detect the four-way handshake between an access point and a client, and crack the password offline without the owner of the access point ever knowing.

An active attack occurs when a malicious actor initiates commands targeting the network or network resources. This is generally meant to disrupt the network's normal operation, conduct reconnaissance, or attempt lateral movements to find and gain access to assets available via the network.

Types of attacks include:

- Passive
  - Network
    - Wiretapping – Third-party monitoring of electronic communications
    - Passive Port scanner – Application designed to probe for open ports
    - Idle scan – Method of attacking a remote computer
    - Encryption – Process of converting plaintext to ciphertext
    - Traffic analysis – Process of intercepting and examining messages
- Active:
  - Network virus (router viruses)
  - Eavesdropping – Act of secretly listening to the private conversation of others
  - Data modification
- Denial-of-service attack
  - Active Port scanner – Application designed to probe for open ports
  - DNS spoofing – Cyberattack using corrupt DNS data
  - Man in the middle – Form of message tampering
  - ARP poisoning – Type of cyberattack
  - VLAN hopping – Computer security exploit
  - Smurf attack – Type of attack on a computer network
  - Buffer overflow – Anomaly in computer security and programming
  - Heap overflow – Software anomaly
  - Format string attack – Type of software vulnerability
  - SQL injection – Computer hacking technique
  - Phishing – Form of social engineering
  - Cross-site scripting – Security issue for web applications
  - CSRF – Malicious website exploit
  - Cyber-attack – Attack on a computer system

== See also ==
- Cloud computing security – Methods used to protect cloud-based assets
- Computer security – Protection of computer systems from information disclosure, theft or damage
- Crimeware – Class of malware designed specifically to automate cybercrime
- IT security standards – Technology standards and techniques
- Data loss prevention software – Data breach protection
- Greynet – Malicious software
- Identity-based security – Access control by authenticated ID
- IDN homograph attack – Visually similar letters in domain names
- Metasploit Project – Computer security testing tool
- Mobile security – Security risk and prevention for mobile devices
- Network enclave – Limited access computer network
- Network Security Toolkit
- TCP Gender Changer – Method in computer networking
- TCP sequence prediction attack – Cyberattack involving counterfeit packets
- List of security hacking incidents
- Wireless security – Aspect of wireless networks
- Dynamic secrets
- Low Orbit Ion Cannon – Network testing and denial-of-service app
- High Orbit Ion Cannon – Denial-of-service attack tool
- Gordon–Loeb model – Method for optimizing information security investments
