= Sipnms =

Network management tool

- Release: October 11, 2010
- Operating system: Cross-platform
- Type: Network monitoring
- License: Proprietary
- Website: www.sipnms.com

sipnms is a web-based network management tool which uses SIP (Session Initiation Protocol) to monitor remote nodes.

== Concept ==
It employs synthetic monitoring to emulate client transactions and these transactions can be implemented using message scripts as per the nodes requirement. This method is useful to monitor VOIP systems performance in the perspective of the customers. Most important part of this concept is that SIP messages can be passed beyond the node directly connected to the Internet. These messages can be converted to by the node behind to required protocols (H.323, SS7, etc.), so that they traverse to destination nodes.

Nodes on a telecommunication network uses different criteria such as number level and message types to route cal control messages. Using message scripts it is possible to send different messages (to and from different numbers or message types) destined to different nodes inside depending upon the response type and time for the response sipnms can generate performance and operations level of the systems under the monitor.

== Features ==
Built in and custom definable message scripts
Easy to understand message scripts, define simple command message and time format to define message scripts. Commands are “waittosend” and “waittoreceive” and message is the message to be sent or wait for. Time define how long to wait in case of “waittoreceive” or how long to wait before sending the message.
Alert (Email and SNMP)
SNMP or email alerts as configuration in system will send alerts when nodes change their status in case of detection of system change
Message Trace
Message trace can be enabled to easily diagnose and view the types of messages received from the node under the monitoring.
Performance Statistics
Users can view how the response time is varied with the time and message sequence are differed from the defined sequence, giving many insights to network in the perspective of the customer

== See also ==
- Website monitoring
- Passive monitoring
- Synthetic monitoring
- Web 2.0
