= Application service management =

Application service management (ASM) is an emerging discipline within systems management that focuses on monitoring and managing the performance and quality of service of business transactions.

ASM can be defined as a well-defined process and use of related tools to detect, diagnose, remedy, and report the service quality of complex business transactions to ensure that they meet or exceed end-users Performance measurements relate to how fast transactions are completed or information is delivered to the end-user by the aggregate of applications, operating systems, hypervisors (if applicable), hardware platforms, and network interconnects. The critical components of ASM include application discovery & mapping, application "health" measurement & management, transaction-level visibility, and incident-related triage. Thus, the ASM tools and processes are commonly used by such roles as Sysop, DevOps, and AIOps.

ASM is related to application performance management (APM) but serves as a more pragmatic, "top-down" approach that focuses on the delivery of business services. In a strict definition, ASM differs from APM in two critical ways.

1. APM focuses exclusively on the performance of an instance of an application, ignoring the complex set of interdependencies that may exist behind that application in the data center. ASM specifically mandates that each application or infrastructure software, operating system, hardware platform, and transactional "hop" be discretely measurable, even if that measurement is inferential. This is critical to ASM's requirement to be able to isolate the source of service-impacting conditions.
2. APM often requires instrumentation of the application for management and measurability. ASM advocates an application-centric approach, asserting that the application and operating system have comprehensive visibility of an application's transactions, dependencies, whether on-machine or off-machine, as well as the operating system itself and the hardware platform it is running on. Further, an in-context agent can also infer network latencies with a high degree of accuracy, and with a lesser degree of accuracy when the transaction occurs between instrumented and non-instrumented platforms.

Application service management extends the concepts of end-user experience management and real user monitoring in that measuring the experience of real users is a critical data point. However, ASM also requires the ability to quickly isolate the root cause of those slow-downs, thereby expanding the scope of real user monitoring/management.

The use of application service management is common for complex, multi-tier transactional applications. Further, the introduction of service-oriented architecture and microservices approaches together with hypervisor-based virtualization technologies have proven a catalyst for the adoption of ASM technologies, as complex applications are disproportionately impacted by the introduction of hypervisors into an existing environment A study by the Aberdeen Group indicates that most deployments of virtualization technologies are hampered by their impact on complex transactional applications.

More and more often ASM approaches are equipped in automated adaptive controllers that consider service-level agreement, cloud computing, real-time and energy-aware application controller targets.

== See also ==
- Application performance management
- Business transaction management
- Systems management
- Integrated business planning
- Network management
- System administration
