= Internet monitoring =

Internet monitoring may refer to:

- Network monitoring, for failures in the network
- Real user monitoring, for threat detection
- Website monitoring, for failures in the servers
- Internet surveillance, for mass surveillance
