= Liz Fong-Jones =

American software developer and activist

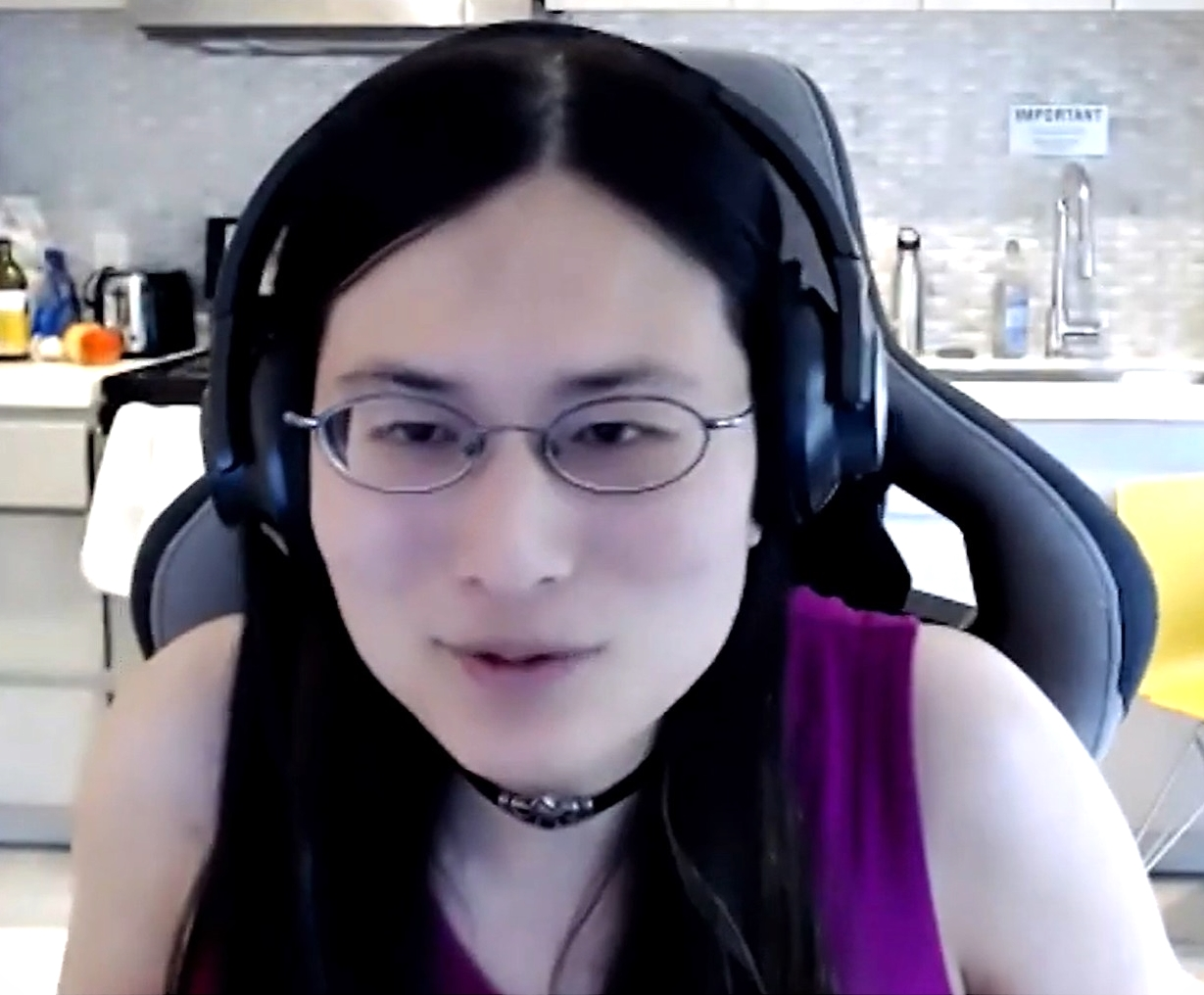
- Fong-Jones in 2020
- Born: 1987 (age 38–39)
- Education: Massachusetts Institute of Technology
- Occupations: Systems engineer, developer advocate
- Years active: 2008–present
- Employer(s): Google, Honeycomb
- Known for: Labor activism
- Website: www.lizthegrey.com

Liz Fong-Jones (born 1987) is a site reliability engineer and developer advocate known for labor activism with her contributions to the Never Again pledge and her role in leading Google worker organization efforts. She is the president of the board of directors of the Solidarity Fund by Coworker, which she seeded with her own money. She is Honeycomb's field chief technology officer.

== Education ==
Fong-Jones started attending college at the California Institute of Technology in 2005, then dropped out in 2007 when she realized she was not going to have enough money to finish school without going into debt. She later returned to school, graduating from the Massachusetts Institute of Technology's Department of Electrical Engineering and Computer Science with a Bachelor of Science degree in 2014.

== Career and activism ==
Fong-Jones started her career in technical support at a massively multi-player online game studio. She says that her career followed in the footsteps of her family members, who are mainly engineers.

=== Google (2008–2019) ===
==== 2008–2016 ====
In 2008, Fong-Jones joined Google, which she said is one of the best places for a transgender person to work, as a systems administrator in their Mountain View, California office, eventually becoming a software engineer in the field of site reliability at their Cambridge, Massachusetts office, followed by their New York City office. She says she began organizing within the company in 2010, focusing on "equity engineering" by working on fixing issues with products that adversely affected marginalized communities, like ensuring accessibility for customers who utilize assistive technology. She later expanded her advocacy to minority groups of employees within the company, like gender pay equity and transgender health care issues.

In 2011, she began taking fellow employees' concerns to management, starting when Google+ was about to launch. On behalf of her and her colleagues, she warned executives from requiring users to disclose their real names. Following public outrage, part of the Nymwars, she successfully negotiated a new policy, which she subsequently communicated directly to concerned employees, making her an unofficial "union representative" for workers.

In 2016, Fong-Jones contributed to the codebase of the 2016 Never Again pledge, which made it easier to verify signatories' identities who pledged not to work on harmful projects.

==== "Google's Ideological Echo Chamber" memo (2017) ====
Fong-Jones said that while the activism always created tension, it turned hostile in 2017 following James Damore's Google's Ideological Echo Chamber memo, which argued that the underrepresentation of women in tech was partially due to innate psychological differences between men and women rather than bias, using talking points from evolutionary psychology. The data and arguments of the essay were criticized by some Google employees and journalists for allegedly perpetuating sexist stereotypes. Damore was later terminated.

On 10 August 2017, Sundar Pichai, the CEO of Alphabet, Google's now-parent company, was set to answer employee questions about the controversy at the company's weekly all-hands, known as TGIF, but canceled it 45 minutes prior, citing the leak of the questions and fear of employee safety for "asking a question". Fong-Jones referred to it as an "excuse" to not answer questions like her own, like why they had let Damore's memo stay on their servers for more than a month if it was grounds for termination, and that she felt it was "a triumph" for her harassers.

After a Google+ conversation criticizing the memo was leaked to an alt-right blog, Vox Popoli, and picked up by public figures such as Milo Yiannopoulos, Fong-Jones became a public target for harassment, blaming her and seven other vocal Google employees for Damore's termination. The harassment included death threats and doxing by other employees on websites such as Breitbart News and 4chan. The targeted employees filed complaints, and said that the security teams were vigilant about physical threats to employee safety, including offering to put doxxed employees in a hotel for a night. Danielle Brown, the company's chief diversity officer at the time, who was also a target of the harassment, was supportive, however none of the complaints about individual employees involved were acted upon, and they were told the leaks may fall under the protection of the National Labor Relations Act of 1935 as "protected concerted activity". Several activist employees who spoke internally about racism and sexism in the wake of the harassment were terminated, and subsequently sued Google. The terms used by some of the reprimanded employees included "white privilege" and "white boy", which Google said in a statement was grounds for termination under their policy that "Promoting harmful stereotypes based on race or gender is prohibited".

In October 2017, Fong-Jones arranged for Coworker.org, a labor group that typically assists blue-collar workers in organizing, to give her colleagues a "know your rights" training. She said that when she and her coworkers felt that internal pressure had been fruitless, they wanted to understand what their legal rights were. They had understood that talking to the press was not allowed, due to the company's culture of secrecy. She said they quickly learned they had the right to talk to the press, and that using Google's social networks would not be legally protected.

Fong-Jones helped start a petition, along with a statement about her and her colleagues decision to go to the press, demanding a safer working environment, including better moderation of mailing lists, and rules against doxing colleagues. The petition gathered 2,600 signatures.

==== Walkout (2018) ====
In February 2018, concerns about Project Maven, a Pentagon project, which Fong-Jones had previously heard about from a small group of engineers in August 2017 working under Dr. Fei-Fei Li, the chief scientist for Artificial Intelligence (AI) on Google Cloud, materialized into an internal Google+ post by Fong-Jones. The post expressed "grave concerns" that Google might be assisting the United States Armed Forces to carry out drone strikes.

Fong-Jones, and a group of engineers who posted concerns about being tasked with building an air gap, were referred to as "the Group of Nine" by outraged employees, causing Diane Greene, then-CEO of Google Cloud, to respond on Google+, which was subsequently leaked to The Intercept. Fong-Jones, who had been solicited for comment by a journalist at the outlet, feared that management would feel backed into a corner and offered to help leadership catch "the leaker". Meredith Whittaker, a former Google Cloud program manager, circulated a petition to other employees demanding cancellation of the contract, writing, "Google should not be in the business of war". In June 2018, Google responded to employee and public pressure, promising not to utilize AI for weapons or surveillance and not to renew its Maven contract.

In October 2018, Google was accused of mishandling sexual harassment complaints, including a $90 million severance package for Andy Rubin, who was accused of coercing a junior employee into sexual contact, which he denied. Fong-Jones said that the company "covers up harassment", contributing to a work environment that discourages women from reporting misconduct, saying that victims believe "the men will be paid and the women will be pushed aside." In 2017, Fong-Jones had alleged on Google+ that she was sexually assaulted by a director at the company, which was later reported on. In a series of tweets, Fong-Jones criticized the company's culture as allowing leadership to operate "abuse of power relationships where there was no consent, or consent was impossible." She went on to name the director from her 2017 Google+ post as Richard DeVaul, the head of X Development, who was also named in The New York Times article about Rubin. DeVaul apologized for his behavior.

On 1 November 2018, across 50 cities, nearly 20,000 Google employees participated in the Google Walkout for Real Change demanding changes over their working conditions, ethical technology concerns, and how the company handles sexual harassment complaints. One of the catalysts was a report that Project Dragonfly (Dragonfly), a search engine built by Google for China involving censorship that was implicated in the persecution of the country's Muslim minority, the Uyghurs, had ignored the company's privacy review process and lied to the public about how close it was to launch. Pichai was later called to appear before the United States House Committee on the Judiciary at a hearing about Dragonfly. He testified that they had no current plans to launch a search product in China.

On 29 November 2018, Fong-Jones started a solidarity strike fund, consulting with Coworker.org (which is backed by Pierre Omidyar of the Omidyar Network), promising that if her fellow employees donated $100,000, she would match it, which she publicized on Twitter. The fund was matched within a few hours, and reached $250,000 within days. Fong-Jones told Fast Company she was seeking to start the fund for workers so that they "feel empowered to speak up about issues in the future", and later to Protocol, "I'm trying to use some of my financial privilege to help those who can't afford to be suddenly laid off". At the time, Fong-Jones noted that the pledges were not binding and that she would work with lawyers and labor organizations to set up a more formal fund.

One of the motivations to threaten to strike again was Dragonfly, and the allegation that the few people with knowledge of the project would be terminated if it was revealed to anyone else, which Google denied. Research scientist Dr. Jack Poulson resigned over the revelations. Fong-Jones threatened to resign if an employee was not appointed to the board of directors, one of the unmet demands from the walkout, by 1 February 2019.

Dragonfly had been the subject of the 1 November walkout, but also a petition in August 2018 co-signed by about 1,400 employees, and another on 27 November by more than 700. Employee concerns were downplayed by Pichai, who said they only wanted to learn what Google would "look like" in China, referring to Dragonfly as a "very early" "exploration", a statement that was later alleged to be false or misleading based on leaked internal communications.

==== Resignation (2019) ====
Fong-Jones voluntarily resigned from Google in early January 2019, saying she wanted to create a "more just world rather than exacerbating inequalities". She said she left a job where her compensation totaled about $800,000 in a year, and a half million in unvested restricted stock.

In her resignation, she offered to reconsider if the company conceded to the previous demand that Google place an employee on its board. Fong-Jones alleges that Google's Human Resources department tried to push her out prior to the end of her notice period, 1 February 2019, and filed a retaliation claim. Google's investigation determined that her allegations were unfounded. She later accepted a stock grant from Google close to around $100,000 to leave early, which she later donated to other organizing workers.

She told Business Insider, "If I didn’t care about Google I probably would have silently quit many, many months or years ago." Fong-Jones said that if she had stayed at Google and continued her activism she would've burned out, but applauded her colleagues who pressed on without her.

Following her departure, she shared responses to her resignation from the application Blind which were mainly derogatory comments, including transphobic and racist comments about her identity. Comments made on Blind are anonymous, but the comments Fong-Jones shared were in the Google section, which requires a Google email address to be authenticated. She said that it was "scary" to know that they were written by some of her coworkers.

In an essay she published on Medium in February 2019, she said, "I have grave concerns about how strategic decisions are made at Google today, and who is missing a seat at the bargaining table."

=== 2019–present ===
In February 2019, Fong-Jones joined the startup named Honeycomb, a software observability service, as the company's first developer advocate. She hopes to help engineers better understand distributed systems. She said she is impressed by the company's commitment to diversity and corporate ethics, with a large number of its leadership roles held by women. In 2021, Fong-Jones spoke at Pulumi's Cloud Engineering Summit for Honeycomb. She is Honeycomb's Field Chief Technology Officer.

Fong-Jones has continued to publicly advocate for inclusion, equity, and diversity in the workplace. She has said that the most important thing companies can do is to involve employees in structural decision-making processes, pointing to European Works Councils as an example for American companies to follow.

In 2019, Fong-Jones invested $200,000 into Tall Poppy, a startup online harassment protection and reputation management company named for the Roman metaphor.

==== The Solidarity Fund ====
In 2020, Coworker.org incorporated The Solidarity Fund, after a year of researching the legal intricacies involved in turning Fong-Jones' Google strike fund into a broader fund for the tech industry. To seed the fund, Fong-Jones donated the equivalent of her exit stock grant, which was distributed to 44 organizing tech workers. Roughly half of the initial fund went to Amazon workers. Fong-Jones joined the board as its president, along with Whittaker. Laurence Berland and other Google workers joined as committee members.

In fall 2021, Fong-Jones and The Solidarity Fund created an emergency fund after Apple workers, including committee member Cher Scarlett, had been vocal about unfair labor practices, and Netflix workers protested over a Dave Chappelle show with transphobic comments. The fund offered stipends up to $5,000 for Apple and Netflix workers who were involved in organizing efforts.

The Solidarity Fund was a winner of Fast Company's 2022 World Changing Ideas Awards.

==== Kiwi Farms lawsuit ====
In May 2023, Fong-Jones brought a defamation case against the Brisbane-based company Flow Chemical and its sole director, Vincent Zhen, who were associated with the IP range used by Kiwi Farms. The lawsuit alleged that the company was helping to keep the forum Kiwi Farms, which has doxxed and targeted her and other LGBTQ people, online. An interlocutory judgment was made against Flow Chemical and Zhen in July 2023, and, in an October 2023 default judgement they were ordered to pay Fong-Jones $445,000 plus costs.

== Personal life ==
In 2012, Fong-Jones rented her car out through RelayRides (now Turo), a ridesharing company that lets users rent their cars out peer-to-peer, to help the environment through car-sharing and to assist other dog owners who had difficulty arranging dog-friendly rental cars. A customer who rented her car crashed into another car, killing himself and injuring four people; police determined the deceased driver was at fault. This created an insurance dispute due to the possibility that the survivors' total claims could exceed RelayRides' $1 million coverage, potentially exposing Fong-Jones to financial liability even though she had no involvement in the crash. The New York Times reported on this case as an example of the potential insurance complications surrounding car-sharing; Fong-Jones said that RelayRides had encouraged her own insurance company Commerce Insurance Group to deny the claim to avoid setting the precedent that car-sharing could lead to personal insurance liability or cancellation, and that Commerce thought RelayRides had a conflict of interest in doing so. Months later, RelayRides' operations were suspended in New York state due to alleged non-compliance with state insurance laws; it relaunched there for commercial hosts in 2021.

Fong-Jones is transgender. She said that she experienced dysphoria that she could not cope with when she was 15, leaving her no choice but to start transitioning. She said that her parents were not supportive, and that her biological father disowned her. She said that she has given 40–50% of her income over several years to support other trans people.

== Selected works ==
- Resolving Outages Faster with Better Debugging Strategies USENIX SRECON18.
- Refining Systems Data without Losing Fidelity USENIX SRECON19.
- Identifying Hidden Dependencies USENIX SRECON20.
- Optimizing Cost and Performance with arm64 USENIX SRECON21.
- Using Serverless Functions for Real-time Observability USENIX SRECON22.
- Charity Majors, Liz Fong-Jones, George Miranda. Observability Engineering: Achieving Production Excellence. O'Reilly Media, 2022. ISBN 9781492076445

== See also ==
- Timnit Gebru
- Chelsey Glasson
- Margaret Mitchell
- Claire Stapleton
