= Lew Cirne =

Canadian technologist and entrepreneur

- Born: February 21, 1970 (age 56); Canada
- Education: Dartmouth College
- Occupations: Computer Scientist, CEO
- Employer: New Relic
- Known for: Application Performance Management
- Website: lewsblog.newrelic.com

Lew Cirne is a Canadian-American Silicon Valley–based technologist and entrepreneur who promotes software analytics technology. He was the founder and CEO of Wily Technology, which was acquired by CA, Inc. in March 2006. Cirne founded the company New Relic in 2008. "New Relic" is an anagram of Lew Cirne's name.

== Career ==
Lew Cirne was raised in Port Hope, Ontario. His parents, Geoff and Jean Cirne, were immigrants to Canada from Manchester, England. Cirne attended Trinity College School and in 1993 received an A.B. from Dartmouth College with a major in computer science. After college, Cirne held senior technical positions at Apple and Hummingbird Communications.

In 1998, Cirne founded Wily Technology. He was responsible for developing Wily Technology's vision of enterprise class application performance management and is credited with bringing it to the Java platform. Cirne was one of the chief technologists and driving force in enterprise application performance and availability. He served as Wily Technology's president and chief executive officer until October 2001.

In 2008, Cirne began focusing on software as a service (SaaS) while an entrepreneur in residence for Benchmark Capital and founded New Relic. New Relic is a provider of Web application performance management. New Relic's technology monitors Web and mobile applications in real-time that run in cloud, on-premises, or hybrid environments.

Cirne stepped down as CEO on July 1, 2021, becoming executive chairman of the company's board of directors. Former Microsoft and Adobe vice president Bill Staples became CEO.

== Contributions ==
Cirne has been described as a pioneer in the development of application performance management (APM). He holds 19 patents in this area of expertise. Cirne has also made major contributions to several other software systems.

In 2006, Cirne and Wily chairman David Strohm announced a $1 million gift to Dartmouth College. The gift supported the creation of an endowed scholarship called the Wily Scholars Fund, and to establish a fund for undergraduate internships in early-stage technology companies, called the Wily Initiative Fund.

In 2016, Cirne funded two full scholarships, and the construction of the Cirne Learning Commons, at Trinity College School.

Cirne is sometimes referred to as the "Coding CEO". He dedicates every Thursday and Friday to coding. Cirne has been known to take week-long coding retreats at his Lake Tahoe cabin, often inviting New Relic developers.

== Accolades ==
Cirne was named as a finalist in the 2013 Ernst & Young Entrepreneur of the Year in Northern California.

In 2024, Cirne was inducted into the Dartmouth Entrepreneurs Hall of Fame.
