= Angus Taylor (disambiguation) =

Angus Taylor (born 1966) is an Australian politician.

Angus Taylor may also refer to:

- Angus Ellis Taylor (1911–1999), mathematician
- Angus Taylor (Halloween), fictional character
- Angus Taylor, bassist for The Magic Gang
