= JenniferSoft =

South Korean software company

JenniferSoft, Inc.
- Industry: Application Performance Monitoring
- Founded: 2005
- Founder: Andy Lee
- Headquarters: Korea Japan
- Key people: Andy Lee (CEO)
- Products: JENNIFER; JENNIFER FRONT; JENNIFER KUBERNETES
- Website: jennifersoft.com

JenniferSoft, Inc. is an application performance management (APM) company headquartered in Paju, South Korea. JenniferSoft develops technology for system architecture development and performance monitoring, error determination and system tuning based on “Performance Theory”.

== History and Foundation ==
JenniferSoft was founded in 2005 by current CEO Andy Lee. JenniferSoft started as a consulting company called Java Service before changing its name to JenniferSoft in 2007.

2005
Java Service Consulting was established and the APM solution JENNIFER 2.0 was released. By the end of 2005 the company achieved US$1.1 million in license revenue.
2007
The company's name was changed from Java Service to JenniferSoft and a U.S regional office was established in San Francisco. JenniferSoft attained 168 customers and achieved US$5.9 million in revenue.
2010
JenniferSoft attained 479 customers, and it was awarded the 2010 New Software presidential prize. JenniferSoft's Netherlands office was established.
2012
Establishment of new headquarters in South Korea as well as JenniferSoft Europe in Austria.

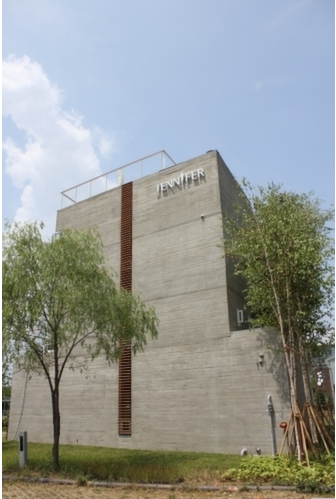
JenniferSoft's new headquarters in South Korea

== Products ==
JENNIFER APM (For Java, .NET, PHP and Python)
A real-time application performance monitoring solution
JENNIFER FRONT
FRONT-END MONITORING SOLUTION (SaaS)SOLUTION
JENNIFER KUBERNETES
KUBERNETES MONITORING SOLUTION

== Offices ==
JenniferSoft Korea
Gyeonggi-do, South Korea
JenniferSoft Japan
Tokyo, Japan
