= Sifflet =

- Type: Private
- Industry: Software; Data observability
- Founded: 2021 in Paris, France
- Founders: Salma Bakouk; Wissem Fathallah; Wajdi Fathallah
- Headquarters: Paris, France
- Key people: Salma Bakouk (CEO); Wissem Fathallah (CPO); Wajdi Fathallah (CTO)
- Products: Data observability platform
- Website: siffletdata.com

Sifflet is a French data observability platform based in Paris.

== History ==
Sifflet was founded in 2021 in Paris by Salma Bakouk, Wissem, and Wajdi Fathallah to identify and address anomalies and quality issues across various data sources.

Sifflet was initially incubated by Paris-based Agoranov and later raised seed funding from Mangrove Capital Partners and Bessemer Venture Partners in November 2021.

In March 2022, Sifflet publicly released its platform.

In March 2023, Sifflet received €12 million in Series A funding led by EQT Ventures.

In June 2025, Sifflet raised another €16 million in funding led by EQT and Mangrove Capital Partners.

== Platform ==
Sifflet is a data observability platform that monitors data quality, health, and lineage within organizational data systems. It connects data sources, data warehouses, analytics applications, and automatically gathers metadata to identify anomalies or inconsistencies. It tracks data quality indicatorm, such as conformity to expected patterns, and maintains data lineage information to help locate the origins of issues.

Sifflet uses machine learning algorithms to analyze datasets for anomalies, in order to simplify incident resolution and prevent faulty data from affecting multiple systems.
