= ITIM =

Itim may refer to:

- Itim, 1976 Horror Film

ITIM may refer to:

- ITIM (nonprofit organization)
- Immunoreceptor tyrosine-based inhibitory motif
- ITIM (news agency)
- International Tibet Independence Movement
- IBM Tivoli Identity Manager, an IBM software product for managing user access to computer resources
- ITIM: IT Infrastructure Monitoring
