= Stackify =

Kansas application performance monitoring software company, acquired by Netreo in 2021

- Type: Private enterprise
- Industry: Software
- Founded: 2012
- Headquarters: Leawood, Kansas, United States
- Area served: Worldwide
- Key people: Matt Watson (Chairman, CEO)
- Products: Prefix, Retrace
- Website: stackify.com

Stackify LLC is an American software company based in Leawood, Kansas. It was founded in January 2012 by Matt Watson, an American entrepreneur. Stackify assists software developers in troubleshooting and provides support with a suite of tools including Prefix and Retrace. Its Retrace product is an application performance management (APM) tool providing error tracking, log management and code-level performance profiling, while Prefix is a developer-focused workstation agent for real-time code analysis during development.

In January 2019, Stackify raised $2.74 million in convertible debt financing from undisclosed investors. In November 2019, the company raised $6 million from Cypress Growth Capital, the Mid-America Angels investment network, along with local angel investors.

In April 2021, Netreo Inc., a company specialising in information technology infrastructure and network monitoring, acquired Stackify LLC for an undisclosed amount.
