= Pipeline Open Data Standard =

The Pipeline Open Data Standard (PODS) is a data model and associated standards for storing information about pipelines. It has been developed and maintained by the PODS Association since 1998. It provides pipeline operators with a database architecture for storing critical information and analysis data about their pipeline systems, and allows them to manage this data geospatially for visualization in GIS platforms.

== PODS Association ==
The PODS Association is a non-profit, member-driven 501(c) organization. A volunteer technical committee is responsible for strategic and technical decisions, and the organization's 12 board members are elected or re-elected yearly. As of November 2022, the executive director position is the only full-time role in the organization, and is currently held by Monique Roberts. It also employs staff in part-time coordination roles for education, marketing, membership and technical matters.

== Membership and model usage ==
Membership of the organization is made up of users of the data model; these are mainly pipeline operators and government agencies. Over the last 25+ years, the PODS data model has been implemented by over 200 pipeline operators in 39 countries, representing over 3 million miles pipeline and systems including facilities, storage and stations. The model is used by the United States Pipeline and Hazardous Materials Safety Administration (PHMSA) to input data into the National Pipeline Mapping System (NPMS).

== Model history ==
- PRE-PODS ISAT Data Model, released in 1993
- PODS 2.0, released in 2001, with fewer than 70 tables
- PODS 3.0, released in 2002, doubled in size, including several submodels
- PODS 3.1, released in 2003
- PODS 3.2, released in 2004 with 157 tables
- PODS 3.2.1, released in 2004, maintenance release
- PODS 4.0, released in 2006, includes ILI submodel and documentation
- PODS 4.0.1, released in 2007, maintenance release
- PODS 4.0.2, released in 2007, maintenance release
- PODS 5.0, released 2009, contains 198 Sub-Models, 652 Tables, and 4,843 Columns
- PODS 5.0 ESRI Spatial GeoDatabase, released 2010
- PODS ESRI Spatial 5.1.1, Released in 2012
- PODS 6.0 Relational, released in 2012
- PODS ESRI Spatial 6.0, Released in 2014
- PODS Lite 7.0, released in 2017
- PODS Lite Geodatabase for APR, released in 2017
- PODS 7.0, released in 2019
- PODS 7.0.1, released in 2021
- PODS 7.0.3, released in 2024

== See also ==
- Gas Technology Institute (formerly Gas Research Institute)
- Open specifications
- Open standard
- Pipeline transport
