= Wily Technology =

CA Wily Technology
- Formerly: Wily Technology
- Headquarters: United States
- Parent: CA, Inc.
- Website: CA Wily Homepage

CA Wily Technology, formerly Wily Technology, Inc., is a software company based in California. Founded in 1998, it was purchased by CA, Inc. in March 2006, and CA Wily Technology is now a division of CA's Service Assurance business unit.

== History ==
Wily was founded in 1998 by Lew Cirne. The Wily name comes from Cirne's previous experiences in the development and marketing of advanced technologies, where the most impressive and valuable were referred to affectionately as "wily technology." Cirne chose the Wily name to embody the creative and aggressive approach to the company's products and business culture. According to Cirne, "it was in the very early days of Web 1.0, and this technology called Java was used to build most of the Web sites in the world, and Web applications in the world. And Wily created a category called ‘application performance management’." It was founded in Brisbane, California.

In 2001, it had 50 employees. In 2003, it opened an office in Munich, Germany. That year, it received $15 million in funding, led by Focus Ventures. Between 2004 and 2005, revenue grew 48%, with $53 million in reported revenue in 2005. In January 2006, Wily reported it had between 450 and 500 customers up til that point. It had customers in the fields of healthcare, media, telecoms, retail, government, and finances.

After eight years of consistent growth, Wily was acquired by CA Technologies for $375 million in March 2006. CA made the purchase to add to its application management software portfolio. When it was acquired, it had offices in Japan, Singapore, the UK, Germany, and France, and was headquartered in San Francisco, California. When it was acquired, it had around 450 employees.

In 2013, CA Technologies sued AppDynamics for allegedly using Wily Technology patents.

== Products ==
The company's software "monitors the performance of applications and lets IT managers diagnose bottlenecks and other problems."

In 2019, ca technologies released CA Application Performance Management (APM), a software suite. CA APM was the main product by the division. In November, 2018 CA became of subsidiary of Broadcom Inc., and product has since been renamed to DX APM.

There are former products as well:

- CA Wily Introscope
- CA Wily Introscope for SAP ABAP
- CA Wily Customer Experience Manager
- CA Wily Customer Experience Manager for Siebel
- CA Wily Portal Manager for BEA WebLogic
- CA Wily Portal Manager for IBM WebSphere
- CA Wily SOA Manager

== See also ==
- Application Performance Management
