= Honeycomb (company) =

American software company

Hound Technology, Inc.
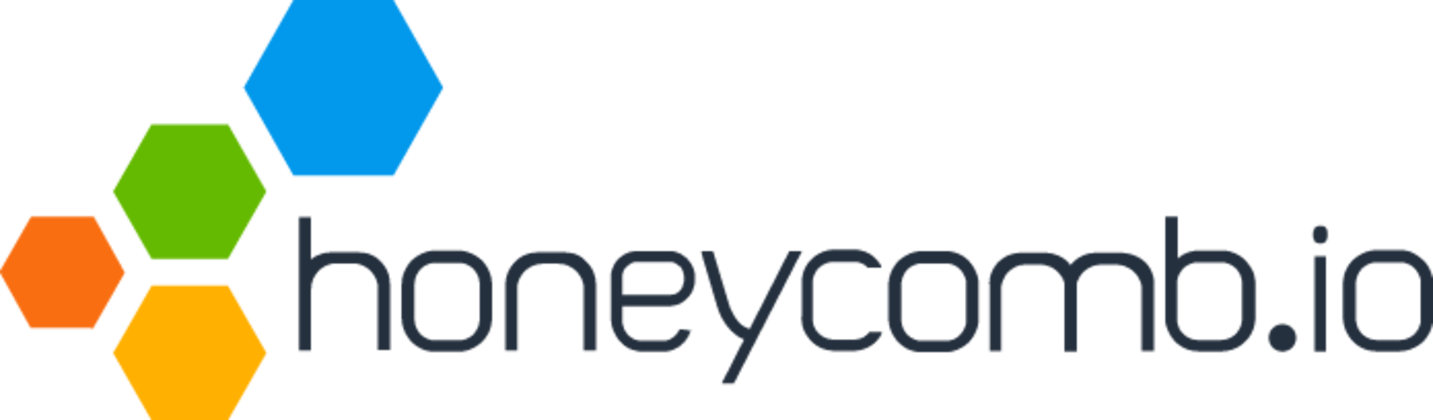
- Trade name: Honeycomb; honeycomb.io
- Company type: Private
- Industry: Software development tooling
- Founded: 2016; 10 years ago
- Founders: Christine Yen (CEO); Charity Majors (CTO)
- Headquarters: San Francisco, California, United States
- Products: Honeycomb
- Services: SaaS observability platform
- Website: www.honeycomb.io

Honeycomb (stylized as honeycomb.io) is an American software company known for its eponymous observability and application performance management (APM) platform and for its diversity, equity, and inclusion (DEI) practices. Honeycomb's venture capital investors to date include Headline, Scale Venture Partners, and Insight Partners.

Honeycomb's tooling enables software developers to debug live software applications, especially those using a microservice architecture. Honeycomb accepts telemetry from applications instrumented with the OpenTelemetry SDKs, in addition to Structured JSON data or other custom integrations. Honeycomb offers metrics and tracing visualizations as well as AI-assisted debugging capabilities. The underlying software is a proprietary columnar database running on Amazon Web Services. Amazon has promoted the company as an early adopter of the Graviton family of ARM processors.

== History ==
Charity Majors in 2019

Honeycomb was founded in 2016 in San Francisco by Charity Majors and Christine Yen, both of whom were engineers at Parse (later acquired by Facebook). After the acquisition of Parse by Facebook, Yen proposed to Majors that they found a startup together. Majors wanted to build a tool that fixes problems with live applications running in the cloud, inspired by the Scuba in-memory analytics tool they had used at Facebook.

Investors invested $4 million in seed money, followed by $11M in Series A funding in 2019 and $20M in Series B funding in 2020. In 2021, Honeycomb announced a $50M Series C funding round. In 2023, Honeycomb announced that it had raised an additional $50 million in Series D funding, for a total of $150 million in funding to-date.

In December 2021, Honeycomb began an experiment in co-determination by appointing an employee representative to its board of directors, an uncommon governance practice for a United States company. As of 2023, the executive team, board, and employees of Honeycomb are each at least half women and non-binary, making the company unusually gender diverse for a technology startup.
