= IBM Tivoli Access Manager =

Corporate web services authentication system

IBM Tivoli Access Manager (TAM) is an authentication and authorization solution for corporate web services, operating systems, and existing applications. Tivoli Access Manager runs on various operating system platforms such as Unix (AIX, Solaris, HP-UX), Linux, and Windows. It has been renamed as IBM Security Access Manager (ISAM), in line with the renaming of other Tivoli products, such as TIM turned ISIM.

In 2002, IBM acquired Access360 software, which it planned to integrate into Tivoli Access Manager. In 2009, IBM and Fujitsu announced a partnership to integrate Fujitsu's biometric authentication technology into TAM. Comparable products from other vendors include Oracle Access Manager, CA SiteMinder, NetIQ Access Manager and SAP NetWeaver Single Sign-On.

== Core components ==
TAM has two core components, which are the foundation upon which its other features are implemented:

- A user registry.
- An authorization service consisting of an authorization database and an authorization engine that performs the decision-making action on the request.

Another related component is the resource manager, which is responsible for applying security policy to resources. The policy enforcer component directs the request to the authorization service for evaluation. Based on the authorization service result (approval or denial) the resource manager allows or denies access to the protected resources. Access Manager authorization decisions are based upon the Privilege Attribute Certificate (PAC), which is created for each user authenticated in an Access Manager environment, regardless of the authentication mechanism used.

== Tivoli Access Manager Family ==
Tivoli Access Manager is not a single product but rather a family of products that use the same core authorization and authentication engine:

- IBM Tivoli Access Manager for e-business (TAMeb)
- IBM Tivoli Access Manager for Operating Systems (TAMOS) - controls access to operating system resources
- IBM Tivoli Access Manager for Enterprise Single Sign-On (TAMESSO)

== See also ==
- IBM Tivoli Identity Manager
