= Open standard =

Standard that is openly accessible and usable by anyone

An open standard is a standard that is openly accessible and usable by anyone. It is also a common prerequisite that open standards use an open license that provides for extensibility. Typically, anybody can participate in their development due to their inherently open nature. There is no single definition, and interpretations vary with usage. Examples of open standards include the GSM, 4G, and 5G standards that allow most modern mobile phones to work world-wide.

== Definitions ==
The terms open and standard have a wide range of meanings associated with their usage. There are a number of definitions of open standards which emphasize different aspects of openness, including the openness of the resulting specification, the openness of the drafting process, and the ownership of rights in the standard. The term "standard" is sometimes restricted to technologies approved by formalized committees that are open to participation by all interested parties and operate on a consensus basis.

The definitions of the term open standard used by academics, the European Union, and some of its member governments or parliaments such as Denmark, France, and Spain preclude open standards requiring fees for use, as do the New Zealand, South African and the Venezuelan governments. On the standard organisation side, the World Wide Web Consortium (W3C) ensures that its specifications can be implemented on a royalty-free basis.

Many definitions of the term standard permit patent holders to impose "reasonable and non-discriminatory licensing" royalty fees and other licensing terms on implementers or users of the standard. For example, the rules for standards published by the major internationally recognized standards bodies such as the Internet Engineering Task Force (IETF), International Organization for Standardization (ISO), International Electrotechnical Commission (IEC), and ITU-T permit their standards to contain specifications whose implementation will require payment of patent licensing fees. Among these organizations, only the IETF and ITU-T explicitly refer to their standards as "open standards", while the others refer only to producing "standards". The IETF and ITU-T use definitions of "open standard" that allow "reasonable and non-discriminatory" patent licensing fee requirements.

There are those in the open-source software community who hold that an "open standard" is only open if it can be freely adopted, implemented and extended. While open standards or architectures are considered non-proprietary in the sense that the standard is either unowned or owned by a collective body, it can still be publicly shared and not tightly guarded. The typical example of "open source" that has become a standard is the personal computer originated by IBM and now referred to as Wintel, the combination of the Microsoft operating system and Intel microprocessor. There are three others that are most widely accepted as "open" which include the GSM phones (adopted as a government standard), Open Group which promotes UNIX, and the Internet Engineering Task Force (IETF) which created the first standards of SMTP and TCP/IP. Buyers tend to prefer open standards which they believe offer them cheaper products and more choice for access due to network effects and increased competition between vendors.

Open standards which specify formats are sometimes referred to as open formats.

Many specifications that are sometimes referred to as standards are proprietary, and only available (if they can be obtained at all) under restrictive contract terms from the organization that owns the copyright on the specification. As such these specifications are not considered to be fully open. Joel West has argued that "open" standards are not black and white but have many different levels of "openness". A more open standard tends to occur when the knowledge of the technology becomes dispersed enough that competition is increased and others are able to start copying the technology as they implement it. This occurred with the Wintel architecture as others were able to start imitating the software. Less open standards exist when a particular firm has much power (not ownership) over the standard, which can occur when a firm's platform "wins" in standard setting or the market makes one platform most popular.

== Specific definitions of an open standard ==
=== Made by standardization bodies ===
==== Joint IEEE, ISOC, W3C, IETF and IAB Definition ====
On August 12, 2012, the Institute of Electrical and Electronics Engineers (IEEE), Internet Society (ISOC), World Wide Web Consortium (W3C), Internet Engineering Task Force (IETF) and Internet Architecture Board (IAB), jointly affirmed a set of principles which have contributed to the exponential growth of the Internet and related technologies. The "OpenStand Principles" define open standards and establish the building blocks for innovation. Standards developed using the OpenStand Principles are developed through an open, participatory process, support interoperability, foster global competition, are voluntarily adopted on a global level and serve as building blocks for products and services targeted to meet the needs of markets and consumers. This drives innovation which, in turn, contributes to the creation of new markets and the growth and expansion of existing markets.

There are five key OpenStand Principles, as outlined below:

1. Cooperation Respectful cooperation between standards organizations, whereby each respects the autonomy, integrity, processes, and intellectual property rules of the others.

2. Adherence to Principles – Adherence to the five fundamental principles of standards development, namely

- Due process: Decisions are made with equity and fairness among participants. No one party dominates or guides standards development. Standards processes are transparent and opportunities exist to appeal decisions. Processes for periodic standards review and updating are well defined.
- Broad consensus: Processes allow for all views to be considered and addressed, such that agreement can be found across a range of interests.
- Transparency: Standards organizations provide advance public notice of proposed standards development activities, the scope of work to be undertaken, and conditions for participation. Easily accessible records of decisions and the materials used in reaching those decisions are provided. Public comment periods are provided before final standards approval and adoption.
- Balance: Standards activities are not exclusively dominated by any particular person, company or interest group.
- Openness: Standards processes are open to all interested and informed parties.

3. Collective Empowerment Commitment by affirming standards organizations and their participants to collective empowerment by striving for standards that:

- are chosen and defined based on technical merit, as judged by the contributed expertise of each participant;
- provide global interoperability, scalability, stability, and resiliency;
- enable global competition;
- serve as building blocks for further innovation; and
- contribute to the creation of global communities, benefiting humanity.

4. Availability Standards specifications are made accessible to all for implementation and deployment. Affirming standards organizations have defined procedures to develop specifications that can be implemented under fair terms. Given market diversity, fair terms may vary from royalty-free to fair, reasonable, and non-discriminatory terms (FRAND).

5. Voluntary Adoption Standards are voluntarily adopted and success is determined by the market.

==== ITU-T definition ====
The ITU-T is a standards development organization (SDO) that is one of the three sectors of the International Telecommunication Union (a specialized agency of the United Nations). The ITU-T has a Telecommunication Standardization Bureau director's Ad Hoc group on IPR that produced the following definition in March 2005, which the ITU-T as a whole has endorsed for its purposes since November 2005:

The ITU-T has a long history of open standards development. However, recently some different external sources have attempted to define the term "Open Standard" in a variety of different ways. In order to avoid confusion, the ITU-T uses for its purpose the term "Open Standards" per the following definition:
"Open Standards" are standards made available to the general public and are developed (or approved) and maintained via a collaborative and consensus driven process. "Open Standards" facilitate interoperability and data exchange among different products or services and are intended for widespread adoption.
Other elements of "Open Standards" include, but are not limited to:
- Collaborative process – voluntary and market driven development (or approval) following a transparent consensus driven process that is reasonably open to all interested parties.
- Reasonably balanced – ensures that the process is not dominated by any one interest group.
- Due process – includes consideration of and response to comments by interested parties.
- Intellectual property rights (IPRs) – IPRs essential to implement the standard to be licensed to all applicants on a worldwide, non-discriminatory basis, either (1) for free and under other reasonable terms and conditions or (2) on reasonable terms and conditions (which may include monetary compensation). Negotiations are left to the parties concerned and are performed outside the SDO.
- Quality and level of detail – sufficient to permit the development of a variety of competing implementations of interoperable products or services. Standardized interfaces are not hidden, or controlled other than by the SDO promulgating the standard.
- Publicly available – easily available for implementation and use, at a reasonable price. Publication of the text of a standard by others is permitted only with the prior approval of the SDO.
- On-going support – maintained and supported over a long period of time.

The ITU-T, ITU-R, ISO, and IEC have harmonized on a common patent policy under the banner of the WSC. However, the ITU-T definition should not necessarily be considered also applicable in ITU-R, ISO and IEC contexts, since the Common Patent Policy does not make any reference to "open standards" but rather only to "standards".

==== IETF definition ====
In section 7 of its RFC 2026, the IETF classifies specifications that have been developed in a manner similar to that of the IETF itself as being "open standards," and lists the standards produced by ANSI, ISO, IEEE, and ITU-T as examples. As the IETF standardization processes and IPR policies have the characteristics listed above by ITU-T, the IETF standards fulfill the ITU-T definition of "open standards".

However, the IETF has not adopted a specific definition of "open standard"; both RFC 2026 and the IETF's mission statement (RFC 3935) talks about "open process", but RFC 2026 does not define "open standard" except for the purpose of defining what documents IETF standards can link to.

RFC 2026 belongs to a set of RFCs collectively known as BCP 9 (Best Common Practice, an IETF policy). RFC 2026 was later updated by BCP 78 and 79 (among others). As of 2011 BCP 78 is RFC 5378 (Rights Contributors Provide to the IETF Trust), and BCP 79 consists of RFC 3979 (Intellectual Property Rights in IETF Technology) and a clarification in RFC 4879. The changes are intended to be compatible with the "Simplified BSD License" as stated in the IETF Trust Legal Provisions and Copyright FAQ based on RFC 5377.

In August 2012, the IETF combined with the W3C and IEEE to launch OpenStand and to publish The Modern Paradigm for Standards. This captures "the effective and efficient standardization processes that have made the Internet and Web the premiere platforms for innovation and borderless commerce". The declaration is then published in the form of RFC 6852 in January 2013.

=== By legislative or governmental bodies ===
==== European Interoperability Framework for Pan-European eGovernment Services ====
The European Union defined the term for use within its European Interoperability Framework for Pan-European eGovernment Services, Version 1.0 although it does not claim to be a universal definition for all European Union use and documentation.

To reach interoperability in the context of pan-European eGovernment services, guidance needs to focus on open standards.

The word "open" is here meant in the sense of fulfilling the following requirements:

- The standard is adopted and will be maintained by a not-for-profit organization, and its ongoing development occurs on the basis of an open decision-making procedure available to all interested parties (consensus or majority decision etc.).
- The standard has been published and the standard specification document is available either freely or at a nominal charge. It must be permissible to all to copy, distribute and use it for no fee or at a nominal fee.
- The intellectual property – i.e. patents possibly present – of (parts of) the standard is made irrevocably available on a royalty-free basis.
- There are no constraints on the re-use of the standard

==== Network Centric Operations Industry Consortium definition ====
The Network Centric Operations Industry Consortium (NCOIC) defines open standard as the following:

Specifications for hardware and/or software that are publicly available implying that multiple vendors can compete directly based on the features and performance of their products. It also implies that the existing open system can be removed and replaced with that of another vendor with minimal effort and without major interruption.

==== Danish government definition ====
The Danish government has attempted to make a definition of open standards, which also is used in pan-European software development projects. It states:

- An open standard is accessible to everyone free of charge (i.e. there is no discrimination between users, and no payment or other considerations are required as a condition of use of the standard)
- An open standard of necessity remains accessible and free of charge (i.e. owners renounce their options, if indeed such exist, to limit access to the standard at a later date, for example, by committing themselves to openness during the remainder of a possible patent's life)
- An open standard is accessible free of charge and documented in all its details (i.e. all aspects of the standard are transparent and documented, and both access to and use of the documentation is free)

==== French law definition ====
The French Parliament approved a definition of "open standard" in its Loi n° 2004-575 du 21 juin 2004 pour la confiance dans l'économie numérique ("Law for Confidence in the Digital Economy"). The definition is (Article 4):

- By open standard is understood any communication, interconnection or interchange protocol, and any interoperable data format whose specifications are public and without any restriction in their access or implementation.

==== German law definition ====
According to the Law on the Use of Public Sector Data an open format is “a file format that is non-proprietary and platform-independent and is made available to the public without restrictions that would hinder the use of the data” and a formal open standard is “a standard set forth in writing that specifies the requirements for ensuring the interoperability of software”.

==== Indian Government definition ====
The necessary characteristics according to the policy of India's Government is an example of royalty-free and a far reaching case of requirements. The required characteristics are:

4.1 Mandatory Characteristics An Identified Standard will qualify as an "Open Standard", if it meets the following criteria:

- 4.1.1 Specification document of the Identified Standard shall be available with or without a nominal fee.
- 4.1.2 The Patent claims necessary to implement the Identified Standard shall be made available on a Royalty-Free basis for the lifetime of the Standard.
- 4.1.3 Identified Standard shall be adopted and maintained by a not-for-profit organization, wherein all stakeholders can opt to participate in a transparent, collaborative and consensual manner.
- 4.1.4 Identified Standard shall be recursively open as far as possible.
- 4.1.5 Identified Standard shall have technology-neutral specification.
- 4.1.6 Identified Standard shall be capable of localization support, where applicable, for all Indian official Languages for all applicable domains.

==== Italian Law definition ====
Italy has a general rule for the entire public sector dealing with Open Standards, although concentrating on data formats, in Art. 68 of the Code of the Digital Administration (Codice dell'Amministrazione Digitale)

[applications must] allow representation of data under different formats, at least one being an open data format.

[...]

[it is defined] an open data format, a data format which is made public, is thoroughly documented and neutral with regard to the technological tools needed to peruse the same data.

==== New Zealand official interoperability framework definition ====
The E-Government Interoperability Framework (e-GIF) defines open standard as royalty-free according to the following text:

While a universally agreed definition of "open standards" is unlikely to be resolved in the near future, the e-GIF accepts that a definition of "open standards" needs to recognise a continuum that ranges from closed to open, and encompasses varying degrees of "openness." To guide readers in this respect, the e-GIF endorses "open standards" that exhibit the following properties:

- Be accessible to everyone free of charge: no discrimination between users, and no payment or other considerations should be required as a condition to use the standard.
- Remain accessible to everyone free of charge: owners should renounce their options, if any, to limit access to the standard at a later date.
- Be documented in all its details: all aspects of the standard should be transparent and documented, and both access to and use of the documentation should be free.

The e-GIF performs the same function in e-government as the Road Code does on the highways. Driving would be excessively costly, inefficient, and ineffective if road rules had to be agreed each time one vehicle encountered another.

==== Portuguese law definition ====
The Portuguese Open Standards Law, adopted in 2011, demands the use of Open Standards, and is applicable to sovereign entities, central public administration services (including decentralized services and public institutes), regional public administration services and the public sector. In it, Open Standards are defined thus:

a) Its adoption is fruit off an open decision process accessible to all interested parties;

b) The specifications document must have been freely published, allowing its copy, distribution and use without restrictions;

c) The specifications document cannot cover undocumented actions of processes;

d) The applicable intellectual property rights, including patents, have been made available in a full, irrevocable and irreversible way to the Portuguese State;

e) There are no restrictions to its implementation.

==== Spanish law definition ====
A law passed by the Spanish Parliament requires that all electronic services provided by the Spanish public administration must be based on open standards. It defines an open standard as royalty-free, according to the following definition (ANEXO Definiciones k):

An open standard fulfills the following conditions:

- it is public, and its use is available on a free [gratis] basis, or at a cost that does not imply a difficulty for the user.
- its use is not subject to the payment of any intellectual [copyright] or industrial [patents and trademarks] property right.

==== South African Government definition ====
The South African Government approved a definition in the "Minimum Interoperability Operating Standards Handbook" (MIOS).

For the purposes of the MIOS, a standard shall be considered open if it meets all of these criteria. There are standards which we are obliged to adopt for pragmatic reasons which do not necessarily fully conform to being open in all respects. In such cases, where an open standard does not yet exist, the degree of openness will be taken into account when selecting an appropriate standard:

1. it should be maintained by a non-commercial organization
2. participation in the ongoing development work is based on decision-making processes that are open to all interested parties.
3. open access: all may access committee documents, drafts and completed standards free of cost or for a negligible fee.
4. It must be possible for everyone to copy, distribute and use the standard free of cost.
5. The intellectual rights required to implement the standard (e.g.essential patent claims) are irrevocably available, without any royalties attached.
6. There are no reservations regarding reuse of the standard.
7. There are multiple implementations of the standard.

==== UK government definition ====
The UK government's definition of open standards applies to software interoperability, data and document formats. The criteria for open standards are published in the "Open Standards Principles" policy paper and are as follows.

1. Collaboration – the standard is maintained through a collaborative decision-making process that is consensus based and independent of any individual supplier. Involvement in the development and maintenance of the standard is accessible to all interested parties.
2. Transparency – the decision-making process is transparent, and a publicly accessible review by subject matter experts is part of the process.
3. Due process – the standard is adopted by a specification or standardisation organisation, or a forum or consortium with a feedback and ratification process to ensure quality.
4. Fair access – the standard is well documented, publicly available and free to use.
5. Mature – completely developed, unless they are in the context of creating innovative solutions.
6. Independent of platform, application and vendor – supported by the market with several implementations.
7. Rights – rights essential to implementation of the standard, and for interfacing with other implementations which have adopted that same standard, are licensed on a royalty-free basis that is compatible with both open source and proprietary licensed solutions. These rights should be irrevocable unless there is a breach of licence conditions.

The Cabinet Office in the UK recommends that government departments specify requirements using open standards when undertaking procurement exercises in order to promote interoperability and re-use, and avoid technological lock-in.

==== Venezuelan law definition ====
The Venezuelan Government approved a "free software and open standards law." The decree includes the requirement that the Venezuelan public sector must use free software based on open standards, and includes a definition of open standard:

Article 2: for the purposes of this Decree, it shall be understood as

k) Open standards: technical specifications, published and controlled by an organization in charge of their development, that have been accepted by the industry, available to everybody for their implementation in free software or other [type of software], promoting competitivity, interoperability and flexibility.

=== By recognized persons ===
==== Bruce Perens' definition ====
One of the most popular definitions of the term "open standard", as measured by Google ranking, is the one developed by Bruce Perens. His definition lists a set of principles that he believes must be met by an open standard:

1. Availability: Open Standards are available for all to read and implement.
2. Maximize End-User Choice: Open Standards create a fair, competitive market for implementations of the standard. They do not lock the customer into a particular vendor or group.
3. No Royalty: Open Standards are free for all to implement, with no royalty or fee. Certification of compliance by the standards organization may involve a fee.
4. No Discrimination: Open Standards and the organizations that administer them do not favor one implementor over another for any reason other than the technical standards compliance of a vendor's implementation. Certification organizations must provide a path for low and zero-cost implementations to be validated, but may also provide enhanced certification services.
5. Extension or Subset: Implementations of Open Standards may be extended, or offered in subset form. However, certification organizations may decline to certify subset implementations, and may place requirements upon extensions (see Predatory Practices).
6. Predatory Practices: Open Standards may employ license terms that protect against subversion of the standard by embrace-and-extend tactics. The licenses attached to the standard may require the publication of reference information for extensions, and a license for all others to create, distribute, and sell software that is compatible with the extensions. An Open Standard may not otherwise prohibit extensions.

Bruce Perens goes on to explain further the points in the standard in practice. With regard to availability, he states that "any software project should be able to afford a copy without undue hardship. The cost should not far exceed the cost of a college textbook".

==== Ken Krechmer's definition ====
Ken Krechmer identifies ten "rights":

1. Open Meeting
2. Consensus
3. Due Process
4. Open IPR
5. One World
6. Open Change
7. Open Documents
8. Open Interface
9. Open Use
10. On-going Support

=== By companies ===
==== Microsoft's definition ====
Vijay Kapoor, national technology officer, Microsoft, defines what open standards are as follows:

Let's look at what an open standard means: 'open' refers to it being royalty-free, while 'standard' means a technology approved by formalized committees that are open to participation by all interested parties and operate on a consensus basis. An open standard is publicly available, and developed, approved and maintained via a collaborative and consensus driven process.

Overall, Microsoft's relationship to open standards was, at best, mixed. While Microsoft participated in the most significant standard-setting organizations that establish open standards, it was often seen as oppositional to their adoption.

=== By non-profit organizations ===
==== Open Source Initiative's definition ====
The Open Source Initiative defines the requirements and criteria for open standards as follows:

The Requirement

An "open standard" must not prohibit conforming implementations in open source software.

The Criteria

To comply with the Open Standards Requirement, an "open standard" must satisfy the following criteria. If an "open standard" does not meet these criteria, it will be discriminating against open source developers.

1. No Intentional Secrets: The standard MUST NOT withhold any detail necessary for interoperable implementation. As flaws are inevitable, the standard MUST define a process for fixing flaws identified during implementation and interoperability testing and to incorporate said changes into a revised version or superseding version of the standard to be released under terms that do not violate the OSR.
2. Availability: The standard MUST be freely and publicly available (e.g., from a stable web site) under royalty-free terms at reasonable and non-discriminatory cost.
3. Patents: All patents essential to implementation of the standard MUST:
  - be licensed under royalty-free terms for unrestricted use, or
  - be covered by a promise of non-assertion when practiced by open source software
4. No Agreements: There MUST NOT be any requirement for execution of a license agreement, NDA, grant, click-through, or any other form of paperwork to deploy conforming implementations of the standard.
5. No OSR-Incompatible Dependencies: Implementation of the standard MUST NOT require any other technology that fails to meet the criteria of this Requirement.

==== World Wide Web Consortium's definition ====
As a provider of Web technology ICT Standards, notably XML, http, HTML, CSS and WAI, the World Wide Web Consortium (W3C) follows a process that promotes the development of quality standards.

Looking at the result, the spec alone, up for adoption, is not enough. The participative/inclusive process leading to a particular design, and the supporting resources available with it should be accounted when we talk about Open Standards:

- transparency (due process is public, and all technical discussions, meeting minutes, are archived and referencable in decision making)
- relevance (new standardization is started upon due analysis of the market needs, including requirements phase, e.g. accessibility, multi-linguism)
- openness (anybody can participate, and everybody does: industry, individual, public, government bodies, academia, on a worldwide scale)
- impartiality and consensus (guaranteed fairness by the process and the neutral hosting of the W3C organization, with equal weight for each participant)
- availability (free access to the standard text, both during development, at final stage, and for translations, and assurance that core Web and Internet technologies can be implemented Royalty-Free)
- maintenance (ongoing process for testing, errata, revision, permanent access, validation, etc.)

In August 2012, the W3C combined with the IETF and IEEE to launch OpenStand and to publish The Modern Paradigm for Standards. This captures "the effective and efficient standardization processes that have made the Internet and Web the premiere platforms for innovation and borderless commerce".

==== Digital Standards Organization definition ====
The Digital Standards Organization (DIGISTAN) states that "an open standard must be aimed at creating unrestricted competition between vendors and unrestricted choice for users." Its brief definition of "open standard" (or "free and open standard") is "a published specification that is immune to vendor capture at all stages in its life-cycle". Its more complete definition follows:

- "The standard is adopted and will be maintained by a not-for-profit organization, and its ongoing development occurs on the basis of an open decision-making procedure available to all interested parties.
- The standard has been published and the standard specification document is available freely. It must be permissible to all to copy, distribute, and use it freely.
- The patents possibly present on (parts of) the standard are made irrevocably available on a royalty-free basis.
- There are no constraints on the re-use of the standard.

A key defining property is that an open standard is immune to vendor capture at all stages in its life-cycle. Immunity from vendor capture makes it possible to improve upon, trust, and extend an open standard over time."

This definition is based on the EU's EIF v1 definition of "open standard", but with changes to address what it terms as "vendor capture". They believe that "Many groups and individuals have provided definitions for 'open standard' that reflect their economic interests in the standards process. We see that the fundamental conflict is between vendors who seek to capture markets and raise costs, and the market at large, which seeks freedom and lower costs... Vendors work hard to turn open standards into franchise standards. They work to change the statutory language so they can cloak franchise standards in the sheep's clothing of 'open standard'. A robust definition of "free and open standard" must thus take into account the direct economic conflict between vendors and the market at large."

==== Free Software Foundation Europe's definition ====
The Free Software Foundation Europe (FSFE) uses a definition which is based on the European Interoperability Framework v.1, and was extended after consultation with industry and community stakeholders. FSFE's standard has been adopted by groups such as the SELF EU Project, the 2008 Geneva Declaration on Standards and the Future of the Internet, and international Document Freedom Day teams.

According to this definition an Open Standard is a format or protocol that is:

1. Subject to full public assessment and use without constraints in a manner equally available to all parties;
2. Without any components or extensions that have dependencies on formats or protocols that do not meet the definition of an Open Standard themselves;
3. Free from legal or technical clauses that limit its utilisation by any party or in any business model;
4. Managed and further developed independently of any single vendor in a process open to the equal participation of competitors and third parties;
5. Available in multiple complete implementations by competing vendors, or as a complete implementation equally available to all parties.

==== FFII's definition ====
The Foundation for a Free Information Infrastructure's definition is said to coincide with the definition issued in the European Interoperability Framework released in 2004.

A specification that is public, the standard is inclusive and it has been developed and is maintained in an open standardization process, everybody can implement it without any restriction, neither payment, to license the IPR (granted to everybody for free and without any condition). This is the minimum license terms asked by standardization bodies as W3C. Of course, all the other bodies accept open standards. But specification itself could cost a fair amount of money (i.e. 100–400 Eur per copy as in ISO because copyright and publication of the document itself).

== Comparison of definitions ==
Publisher	Time of publication	Availability		Usage rights		Process		Completeness
Publisher	Time of publication	Free of charge	FRAND terms	Royalty-free, irrevocably	FRAND terms	Open participation	Open viewing	Needs multiple vendor implementations or open reference for maturity
Joint IEEE, ISOC, W3C, IETF, IAB	2012-08-12	No	No	No	Red herring	No	No	No
ITU-T	2005-03	No	Yes	No	Yes	No	No	No
Pan-European eGovernment	2004	0 or nominal	—N/a	Yes	—N/a	Yes	—N/a	No
Danish government	2004	Yes	—N/a	Unclear	—N/a	No	No	No
French law	2004	Implied	—N/a	Implied	—N/a	No	No	No
Indian government	2014	0 or nominal	—N/a	Yes	—N/a	No	No	No
Italian law	2005-03-07	No	No	No	No	No	No	No
New Zealand e-GIF	2007-06-22	Yes	—N/a	Unclear	—N/a	No	No	No
Portuguese law	2011-06-21	Yes	—N/a	Yes	—N/a	Yes	—N/a	No
South African government	2007	Yes	—N/a	Yes	—N/a	Yes	—N/a	Yes
Spanish law	2007-06-22	No	No	0 or low	—N/a	No	No	No
UK government	2012	0 or low	—N/a	Yes	—N/a	Yes	—N/a	Yes
Venezuelan law	2004-12-23	No	No	Implied	—N/a	No	No	No
Bruce Perens	before 2002	Preferred	Implied	Yes	—N/a	No	No	No
Microsoft	c. 2006	No	No	Yes	—N/a	Yes	—N/a	No
Open Source Initiative	2006–09	No	Yes	Partial	No	Yes	—N/a	No
Ken Krechmer	2005-01	No	Yes	Yes	—N/a	Yes	—N/a	No
W3C	2005–09	Yes	—N/a	Yes	—N/a	Yes	—N/a	No
DIGISTAN	c. 2008	Yes	—N/a	Yes	—N/a	Yes	—N/a	No
FSFE	2001	Yes	No	Implied	—N/a	Yes	—N/a	Yes
FFII	before 2004	No	No	Yes	—N/a	No	No	No

== Examples of open standards ==
Note that because the various definitions of "open standard" differ in their requirements, the standards listed below may not be open by every definition.

=== System ===
- World Wide Web architecture specified by W3C
- ETIM Technical Information Model, a classification model for technical products

=== Hardware ===
- Extended Industry Standard Architecture (EISA) (a specification for plug-in boards to 16-bit IBM-architecture PCs, later standardized by the IEEE)
- Industry Standard Architecture (ISA) (is a retroactively named specification for plug-in boards to 8-bit IBM-architecture PCs. The short-lived EISA, and renaming of ISA was in response to IBM's move from "AT standard bus" to proprietary Micro Channel Architecture).
- Peripheral Component Interconnect (PCI) (a specification by Intel Corporation for plug-in boards to IBM-architecture PCs)
- Accelerated Graphics Port (AGP) (a specification by Intel Corporation for plug-in boards to IBM-architecture PCs)
- PCI Industrial Computer Manufacturers Group (PICMG) (an industry consortium developing Open Standards specifications for computer architectures)
- Synchronous dynamic random-access memory (SDRAM) and its DDR SDRAM variants (by JEDEC Solid State Technology Association)
- Universal Serial Bus (USB) (by USB Implementers Forum)
- DiSEqC by Eutelsat

=== File formats ===
- Computer Graphics Metafile (CGM) (file format for 2D vector graphics, raster graphics, and text defined by ISO/IEC 8632)
- Darwin Information Typing Architecture (DITA) (a format and architecture to create and maintain technical documentation defined by OASIS)
- Hypertext Markup Language (HTML), Extensible HTML (XHTML) and HTML5 (specifications of the W3C for structured hyperlinked document formatting)
- Office Open XML (a specification by Microsoft for document, spreadsheet and presentation formats, approved by ISO as ISO/IEC 29500) (openness is contested)
- Ogg (a container for Vorbis, FLAC, Speex, Opus (audio formats) & Theora (a video format), by the Xiph.Org Foundation)
- OpenDocument Format (ODF) (by OASIS for document, spreadsheet, presentation, graphics, math and other formats, approved by ISO as ISO/IEC 26300)
- Opus (audio codec, defined by IETF RFC 6716)
- Portable Document Format (PDF/X) (a specification by Adobe Systems Incorporated for formatted documents, later approved by ISO as ISO 15930-1:2001)
- Portable Network Graphics (PNG) (a bitmapped image format that employs lossless data compression, approved by ISO as ISO/IEC 15948:2004)
- Scalable Vector Graphics (SVG) (a specification for two-dimensional vector graphics developed by the World Wide Web Consortium (W3C)).

=== Protocols ===
- Connected Home over IP (also known as "Project Connected Home over IP" or "CHIP" for short) is a proprietary, royalty-free home automation connectivity standard project which features compatibility among different smart home and Internet of things (IoT) products and software.
- Ethernet is a standard of the IEEE, ECMA, IEC, and ISO for networking computers at the data link layer.
- Internet Protocol (IP) (a specification of the IETF for transmitting packets of data on a network at the internet layer – specifically, IETF RFC 791
- MQTT (Message Queuing Telemetry Transport) is a lightweight, publish-subscribe network protocol that transports messages between devices.
- Transmission Control Protocol (TCP) (a specification of the IETF for implementing streams of data on top of IP – specifically, IETF RFC 793)
- OMA Data Synchronization and Device Management (a platform-independent data synchronization protocol, specified by The SyncML Initiative/Open Mobile Alliance)
- XMPP – an open protocol for near-real-time instant messaging (IM) and presence information (a.k.a. buddy lists)

=== Programming languages ===
- ANSI C (a general-purpose programming language, approved by ISO as ISO/IEC 9899)
- Ada, a multi-paradigm programming language, defined by joint ISO/ANSI standard, combined with major Amendment ISO/IEC 8652:1995/Amd 1:2007
- MUMPS, a dynamically typed programming language, originally designed for database-driven applications in the healthcare industry approved by ISO as ISO/IEC 11756:1992 and ISO/IEC 11756:1999

=== Other ===
Data2Dome logo

- Data2Dome a standard for planetarium dome content distribution.
- Apdex (Application Performance Index) (specifies a uniform way to analyze and report on the degree to which the measured performance of software applications meets user expectations
- Application Response Measurement (ARM) (defines an API for C and Java programming language to measure application transaction response times, adopted by The Open Group)
- CD-ROM (Yellow Book) (a specification for data interchange on read-only 120 mm optical data disks, approved by ISO as ISO/IEC 10149 and ECMA as ECMA-130)
- Common Information Model (CIM) (a specification by DMTF for defining how managed elements in an IT environment are represented as a common set of objects and relationships between them)
- Universal Data Element Framework (UDEF) an open standard by The Open Group that provides the foundation for building an enterprise-wide Controlled vocabulary enabling Interoperability.
- CIPURSE an open standard by OSPT Alliance which is a set of specifications to implement secure element (contactless smart card, NFC SIM, Embedded Secure element)for Urban Transport Network and Value Added Services.
- OpenReference, an open reference model for business performance, processes and practices,
- General Transit Feed Specification (GTFS) standard for public transport data developed by Google
- Pipeline Open Data Standard (PODS)

== Examples of associations ==
- JEDEC Solid State Technology Association – sets SDRAM Open standard
- Open Geospatial Consortium – develops and publishes open standards for spatial data and services
- Open Handset Alliance – sets Open standards mobile device hardware.
- OSPT Alliance – sets open standard named CIPURSE
- A4L – the Access For Learning Association sets k12 educational data interoperability structures.
- USB Implementers Forum – sets standards for Universal Serial Bus
- World Wide Web Consortium (W3C) – sets Open standards for the Internet, such as protocols, programming languages, etc.

== Patents ==
In 2002 and 2003 the controversy about using reasonable and non-discriminatory (RAND) licensing for the use of patented technology in web standards increased. Bruce Perens, important associations as FSF or FFII and others have argued that the use of patents restricts who can implement a standard to those able or willing to pay for the use of the patented technology. The requirement to pay some small amount per user, is often an insurmountable problem for free/open source software implementations which can be redistributed by anyone. Royalty-free (RF) licensing is generally the only possible license for free/open source software implementations. Version 3 of the GNU General Public License includes a section that enjoins anyone who distributes a program released under the GPL from enforcing patents on subsequent users of the software or derivative works.

One result of this controversy was that many governments (including the Danish, French and Spanish governments singly and the EU collectively) specifically affirmed that "open standards" required royalty-free licenses. Some standards organizations, such as the W3C, modified their processes to essentially only permit royalty-free licensing.

Patents for software, formulas and algorithms are currently enforceable in the US but not in the EU. The European Patent Convention expressly prohibits algorithms, business methods and software from being covered by patents. The US has only allowed them since 1989 and there has been growing controversy in recent years as to either the benefit or feasibility.

A standards body and its associated processes cannot force a patent holder to give up its right to charge license fees, especially if the company concerned is not a member of the standards body and unconstrained by any rules that were set during the standards development process. In fact, this element discourages some standards bodies from adopting an "open" approach, fearing that they will lose out if their members are more constrained than non-members. Few bodies will carry out (or require their members to carry out) a full patent search. Ultimately, the only sanctions a standards body can apply on a non-member when patent licensing is demanded is to cancel the standard, try to rework around it, or work to invalidate the patent. Standards bodies such as W3C and OASIS require that the use of required patents be granted under a royalty-free license as a condition for joining the body or a particular working group, and this is generally considered enforceable.

Examples of patent claims brought against standards previously thought to be open include JPEG and the Rambus case over DDR SDRAM. The H.264 video codec is an example of a standards organization producing a standard that has known, non-royalty-free required patents.

Often the scope of the standard itself determines how likely it is that a firm will be able to use a standard as patent-like protection. Richard Langlois argues that standards with a wide scope may offer a firm some level of protection from competitors but it is likely that Schumpeterian creative destruction will ultimately leave the firm open to being "invented around" regardless of the standard a firm may benefit from.

== Quotes ==
- EU Commissioner Erkki Liikanen: "Open standards are important to help create interoperable and affordable solutions for everybody. They also promote competition by setting up a technical playing field that is level to all market players. This means lower costs for enterprises and, ultimately, the consumer." (World Standards Day, 14 October 2003)
- Jorma Ollila, Chairman of Nokia's Board of Directors: "... Open standards and platforms create a foundation for success. They enable interoperability of technologies and encourage innovativeness and healthy competition, which in turn increases consumer choice and opens entirely new markets,"
- W3C Director Tim Berners-Lee: "The decision to make the Web an open system was necessary for it to be universal. You can't propose that something be a universal space and at the same time keep control of it."
- In the opening address of The Southern African Telecommunications Networks and Applications Conference (SATNAC) 2005, then Minister of Science and Technology, Mosibudi Mangena stressed need for open standards in ICT:

[...] The tsunami that devastated South Eastern Asian countries and the north-eastern parts of Africa, is perhaps the most graphic, albeit unfortunate, demonstration of the need for global collaboration, and open ICT standards. The incalculable loss of life and damage to property was exacerbated by the fact that responding agencies and non-governmental groups were unable to share information vital to the rescue effort. Each was using different data and document formats. Relief was slowed, and coordination complicated. [...]

— Mosibudi Mangena, Opening address of SATNAC 2005

== See also ==
- Conformity assessment
- Open format
- Open-source software
- Free standard
- Network effect
- Open data
- Open-design movement
- Open-source hardware
- Open specifications
- Open system (computing)
- Specification (technical standard)
- Vendor lock-in
- Digital public goods
