= Arnold Allen (mathematician) =

American instructor, public speaker, and writer

Arnold Oral Allen (died 2004) was an American instructor, public speaker, and writer who worked at IBM and Hewlett-Packard, and specialized in the analysis and mathematical modelling of computer performance.

== Biography ==
Allen earned a Ph.D. in mathematics at UCLA in 1962 under Angus Taylor with a dissertation entitled Banach and Hilbert Spaces of Analytic Functions, where he later lectured. At IBM, he taught at the Information Systems Management Institute in Los Angeles, California. Later, at Hewlett-Packard, he was a member of the Performance Technology Center, then a researcher at the Advanced Technology Group in Roseville, California.

Allen was elected as a director of the Computer Measurement Group (CMG), and selected to be the keynote speaker at two international conferences. He was an invited speaker at the Sixth International Conference on Modelling Techniques and Tools for Computer Performance Evaluation, held in Edinburgh, Scotland in September 1992.

In 1994, he received the Computer Measurement group's A. A. Michelson award for technical excellence and professional contributions as a teacher and inspirer of others.

== Work ==
Allen is most well known as the author of the book, Probability, Statistics, and Queueing Theory with Computer Science Applications. Originally published in 1978, and still in print in 2007, it is widely used as a university textbook, by practitioners of computer performance analysis, and by those wishing to apply probability, statistics and queueing theory techniques to solve problems in other fields, such as operations research, management science, engineering, and physics.

At IBM and Hewlett-Packard, Allen's students were typically systems engineers and project managers, not computer scientists. He encouraged them to improve upon the informal approaches to computer performance analysis that were (and still are) in common use, applying more formal methods and using mathematical models to predict how the performance of a computer system would behave as workloads increased. He began his 1994 book, Computer Performance Analysis with Mathematica, with this observation:

The word performance in computer performance means the same thing that performance means in other contexts, that is, it means "How well is the computer doing the work it is supposed to do?"

He concluded the book by quoting George Bernard Shaw: "The reasonable man adapts himself to the world; the unreasonable man persists in trying to adapt the world to himself. Therefore all progress depends on the unreasonable man". Allen commented, "I hope the reader fits Shaw's definition of unreasonable, and wants to change things for the better".

== Publications ==
- 1978. Probability, statistics, and queueing theory : with computer science applications
- 1994. Introduction to computer performance analysis with Mathematica.
- 1996. Mathematica CD-ROM library
