= Neil J. Gunther =

Australian computer scientist and physicist

Neil James Gunther
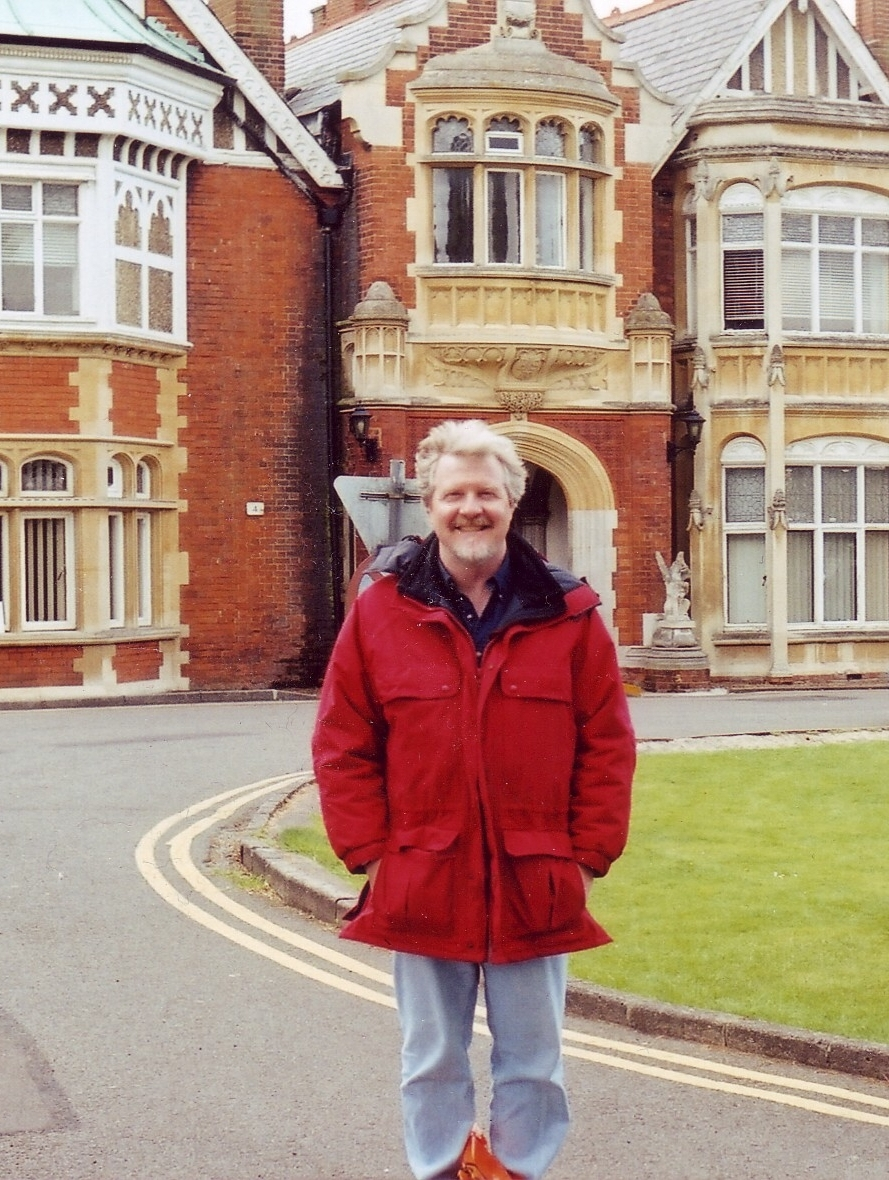
- Neil Gunther at Bletchley Park 2002
- Born: 15 August 1950 (age 76); Preston, Victoria, Australia
- Education: La Trobe University; University of Southampton
- Known for: Performance analysis Capacity planning tools Theory of large transients Universal scalability law
- Scientific career
- Fields: Theoretical Physics, Computer System Performance Modeling, Quantum Information Systems
- Workplaces: San Jose State University; JPL (Jet Propulsion Laboratory); Xerox Palo Alto Research Center; Performance Dynamics Company; École Polytechnique Fédérale de Lausanne (EPFL)
- Thesis: Broken Dynamical Symmetries in Quantum Mechanics and Phase Transition Phenomena
- Doctoral advisor: David J. Wallace

Neil Gunther (born 15 August 1950) is a computer information systems researcher best known internationally for developing the open-source performance modeling software Pretty Damn Quick (PDQ) along with the Guerrilla approach to computer capacity planning and performance analysis. He has also been cited for his contributions to the theory of large transients in computer systems and packet networks, and his universal law of computational scalability.

Gunther is a Senior Member of both the Association for Computing Machinery (ACM) and the Institute of Electrical and Electronics Engineers (IEEE), as well as a member of the American Mathematical Society (AMS), American Physical Society (APS), Computer Measurement Group (CMG) and ACM SIGMETRICS.

== Education ==
Gunther is an Australian of German and Scots ancestry, born in Melbourne on 15 August 1950. He grew up in the suburb of North Balwyn, matriculating from Balwyn High School in 1968.

He obtained a B.Sc in Chemistry in 1971, as well as a B.Sc.(Hons) in Physics, under Dr. Tomas M. Kalotas in 1974, and an M.Sc. in Applied Mathematics, under Prof. Christie J. Eliezer) in 1976; all from LaTrobe University. He then obtained a Ph.D. in Theoretical Physics from Southampton University in 1980.

== Research ==
Gunther taught physics at San Jose State University from 1980 to 1981. He then joined Syncal Corporation as a scientist contracted by NASA and JPL to develop thermoelectric materials for their deep-space missions. There, he discovered that the stability of the silicon–germanium (Si-Ge) thermoelectric alloy was controlled by a soliton-based precipitation mechanism. JPL used his work to select the next generation thermoelectric materials for the Galileo mission launched in 1989.

In 1982, Gunther joined the Xerox PARC research center to develop parametric and functional test software for PARC's small-scale VLSI design fabrication line. Ultimately, he was recruited onto the Dragon multiprocessor workstation project where he also developed the PARCbench multiprocessor benchmark. In 1989, he developed a version of Feynman's path integral formalism for analyzing performance degradation in large-scale computer systems and packet networks.

In 1990 Gunther joined Pyramid Technology (later absorbed into Fujitsu Technology Solutions via a merger with Fujitsu Siemens Computers) where he held positions as senior scientist and manager of the Performance Analysis Group that was responsible for attaining industry-high TPC benchmarks on their Unix multiprocessors. The progenitor of the Universal Scalability Law, or USL model, was developed to assess and predict in-house TPC benchmark scalability. That work was eventually elaborated upon in Chaps. 4-6 of the Guerrilla book He also performed event-based queueing simulations for the design of the Reliant RM1000 parallel database server.

In 1994 Gunther founded Performance Dynamics Company as a sole proprietorship, registered in California, to provide consulting and educational services for the management of high performance computer systems with an emphasis on performance analysis and enterprise-wide capacity planning. Training classes based on his Guerrilla Capacity Planning techniques have been presented worldwide at companies like Deutsche Bank, FedEx, Vodafone, and Walmart.

He went on to release and develop his own open-source performance modeling software called "PDQ (Pretty Damn Quick)" around 1998. That software also accompanied his first textbook on performance analysis entitled The Practical Performance Analyst. Several additional books followed. Additionally, the original Universal Scalability Law (USL) was extended in two ways

1. A third parameter was introduced that made it easier to solve the USL using nonlinear statistical regression techniques, as well as gain more information about scalability characteristics.
2. Discrete-event simulations were used to corroborate the correctness of two earlier theorems (from 2002 and 2008) that had been used to derive the USL from formal queueing theory.

From 2005 to 2008, Gunther was a member of the Quantum Engineering team at EPFL that developed a CMOS-based single-photon array imager (a quantum camera) capable of detecting intensity correlated photons.

Current research interests include applying the Universal Scalability Law to GenAI platforms.

== Awards ==
- Senior Member ACM (elected April 2009).
- Senior Member IEEE (elected February 2009).
- Recipient of the A. A. Michelson Award, December 2008.
- Summer Research Institute visitor, EPFL 2006 and 2007.
- Lecturer, Western Institute of Computer Science, Stanford University, 1997–2000.
- Best paper award, CMG conference 1996.
- Visiting Scholar in Materials Science, Stanford University, 1981–1982.
- Science Research Council Studentship, U.K. 1976–1980.
- Commonwealth Postgraduate Scholarship, Australia 1975–1976.

== Selected bibliography ==
=== Theses ===
- The Feynman Path Integral in Non-Relativistic Quantum Mechanics and Quantum Electrodynamics, La Trobe University (AUS), BSc Honors dissertation, department of physics, October (1974)
- Dynamical Symmetry Groups: The Study and Interpretation of Certain Invariants as Group Generators in Quantum Mechanics, La Trobe University (AUS), MSc dissertation, department of applied mathematics, November (1976)
- Broken Dynamical Symmetries in Quantum Field Theory and Phase Transition Phenomena, University of Southampton (U.K.), PhD dissertation, department of physics, December (1979)

=== Books ===
- The Practical Performance Analyst, McGraw-Hill, New York, New York 1998, ISBN 0-07-912946-3
- Performance Engineering: State of the Art and Current Trends, Lecture Notes in Computer Science, Springer-Verlag, Heidelberg, Germany, October 2001, ISBN 3-540-42145-9 (Contributed chapter)
- Analyzing Computer System Performance with Perl::PDQ, Springer, Heidelberg 2005, ISBN 3-540-20865-8
- Guerrilla Capacity Planning, Springer, Heidelberg 2007, ISBN 3-540-26138-9
- Programming Multicore and Many-core Computing Systems, Contributed chapter, Wiley Series on Parallel and Distributed Computing, John Wiley & Sons, Inc., Hoboken, New Jersey, February 2017, ISBN 978-0-470-93690-0
