= Website monitoring =

Checking expected operations of a website

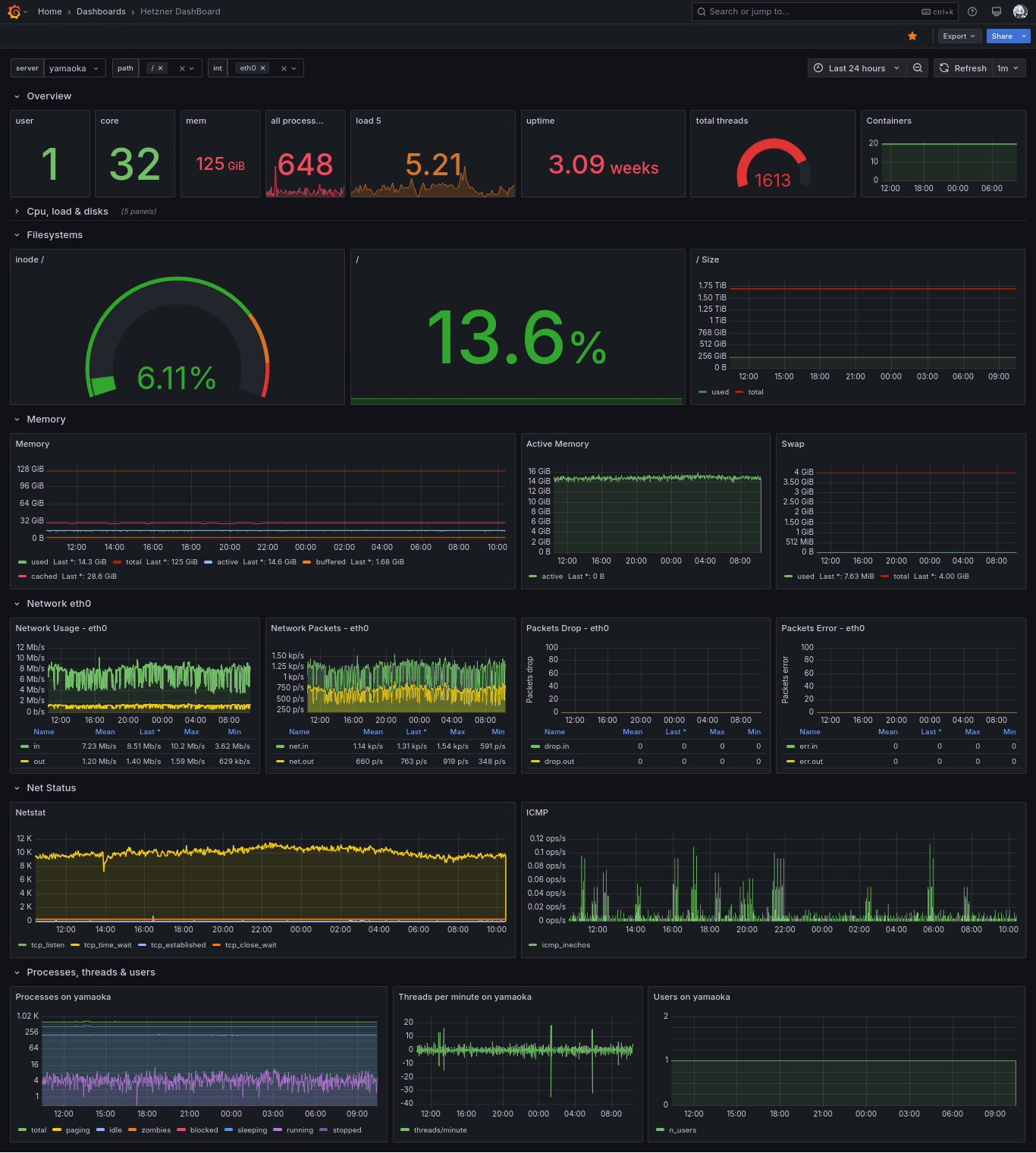
Example of a website monitoring (in this case, a server of MusicBrainz) with a web dashboard (using Grafana)

Website monitoring is the process of testing and verifying that end-users can interact with a website or web application as expected. Website monitoring are often used by businesses to ensure website uptime, performance, and functionality is as expected.

Website monitoring companies provide organizations the ability to consistently monitor a website or server function and observe how it responds. The monitoring is often conducted from several locations around the world to a specific website, or server, to detect issues related to general Internet latency, and network hop issues, and to prevent false positives caused by local or inter-connect problems. Monitoring companies generally report on these tests in a variety of reports, charts, and graphs. When an error is detected monitoring services send out alerts via email, SMS, phone, SNMP trap, a pager that may include diagnostic information, such as a network traceroute, code capture of a web page's HTML file, a screenshot of a webpage, and even a video of a website failing. These diagnostics allow network administrators and webmasters to correct issues faster.

Monitoring gathers extensive data on website performance, such as load times, server response times, and page element performance that is often analyzed and used to further optimize website performance.

== Purpose ==
Monitoring is essential to ensure that a website is available to users, downtime is minimized, and performance can be optimized. Some platforms, like Webflow, Wix, and Duda, handle hosting and monitoring internally, providing visibility into uptime and performance without requiring third-party monitoring tools.

Users that rely on a website or an application for work or pleasure will get frustrated or even stop using the application if it is not reliably available. Monitoring can cover many things that an application needs to function, like network connectivity, Domain Name System records, database connectivity, bandwidth, and computer resources like free RAM, CPU load, disk space, events, etc. Commonly measured metrics are response time and availability (or uptime), but consistency and reliability metrics are gaining popularity. Measuring a website's availability and reliability under various amounts of traffic is often referred to as load testing.

Website monitoring also helps benchmark the website against the performance of a competitor to help determine how well a site is performing. Website speed is also used as a metric for search engine rankings.

Website monitoring can be used to hold web hosting providers accountable for their service-level agreements. Most web hosts offer a 99.9% uptime guarantee and when uptime is less than that, individuals can be refunded for the excessive downtime. Not all hosts will refund individuals for excessive downtime so one must become familiar with the terms of service of their host.

Most paid website monitoring services will also offer security features such as virus and malware scanning which is of growing importance as websites become more complicated and integral to the business.

== Internal vs. external ==
Website monitoring can be done from both inside and outside of a corporate firewall. Traditional network management solutions focus on inside the firewall monitoring, whereas external performance monitoring will test and monitor performance issues across the Internet backbone and in some cases all the way to the end-user. Third-party website performance monitoring solutions can monitor internal (behind the firewall), external (customer-facing), or cloud-based Web applications.

Inside the firewall, monitoring is done by special hardware appliances which can help you determine if your internal applications’ sluggish performance is caused by: the design of applications, internal infrastructure, internal applications or connections to any public Internet.

External performance monitoring is also known as end-user monitoring or end-to-end performance monitoring.

Real user monitoring measures the performance and availability experienced by actual users, diagnoses individual incidents, and tracks the impact of a change.

== Measures of website availability ==
Availability	Nines	Downtime per year
90%	1 nine	876 hours
95%	–	438 hours
99%	2 nines	87 hours, 36 minutes
99.9%	3 nines	8 hours, 45 minutes, 36 seconds
99.99%	4 nines	52 minutes, 33.6 seconds
99.999%	5 nines	5 minutes, 15.36 seconds
99.9999%	6 nines	31.68 seconds

== Types of protocol ==
A website monitoring service can check other internet protocols besides HTTP pages and HTTPS such as FTP, SMTP, POP3, ActiveSync, IMAP, DNS, SSH, Telnet, SSL, TCP, PING, UDP, SOAP, Domain Name Expiry, SSL Certificate Expiry and a range of ports. Monitoring frequency occurs at intervals of once every 4-hours to every 15-seconds. Typically, most website monitoring services test a server, or application, between a once-per-hour per once-per-minute.

Advanced monitoring services capture browser interactions with websites using macro recorders, or browser add-ons such as Selenium or iMacros. These services test a website by running a web browser through a typical website transaction (such as a shopping cart) or a custom scenario, in order to check for user experience issues, performance problems, and availability errors. Browser-driven monitoring services detect not only network and server issues, but also webpage object issues (such as slow loading JavaScript, or third-party hosted page elements).

Implementation of time performance monitoring for the Apache HTTP Server is the mod_arm4 module.

== Types of monitoring ==
Users of website monitoring (typically network administrators, webmasters, web operations personnel) may monitor a single page of a website, but can also monitor a complete business process (often referred to as multi-step transactions).

== Servers monitoring from around the globe ==
Website monitoring services usually have a number of servers around the globe – South America, Africa, North America, Europe, Africa, Asia, Australia and other locations. By having multiple servers in different geographic locations, a monitoring service can determine if a web server is available across continents over the Internet. Some vendors claim that the more locations the better picture of your website availability while others say that three globally distributed stations are sufficient and more stations do not give more information.

Some monitoring services use multi-region consensus, where an alert is only triggered when a failure is confirmed from multiple independent probe locations simultaneously, rather than from a single location. At typical backbone reliability rates (99.95%), single-region monitoring can produce approximately five false positive alerts per week per monitor due to transient routing failures unrelated to the target server, whereas three-region consensus reduces the probability of a path-related false positive by several orders of magnitude.

== Types ==
There are two main types of website monitoring

- Synthetic monitoring is also known as active monitoring, and
- Passive monitoring is also known as real monitoring.

== Levels of website monitoring ==
There are different levels of website monitoring, the more complex your website, the more complex your monitoring needs:

- Level 1 Uptime Monitoring – Availability of a Critical Page
- Level 2 Transaction Monitoring – Availability of a Critical Process
- Level 3 Performance Monitoring – Performance of a Critical Page
- Level 4 Synthetic Monitoring – Performance of a Critical Process
- Level 5 Customer Journey Monitoring – Level 1 to 4 plus Security Information

== Notification options: alerts ==
As the information brought by website monitoring services is in most cases urgent and may be of crucial importance, various notification methods, often known as "alerts" are used: e-mail, IM, regular and cell phones, SMS, fax, pagers, Skype, RSS Feed, SNMP trap, URL notifications, etc.

== Website monitoring services ==
The Website monitoring market is very competitive. There are 150+ active service providers and more than 100 are documented to have gone out of business. Most of the providers offer a free plan with low-frequency monitoring.

In recent years Synthetic Monitoring services have become widely available commercially, providing another vehicle to monitor the performance of specific web properties at a granular level.

== See also ==
- Application performance management
- Application Response Measurement
- Internet server monitoring
- Network monitoring
- Page view
- Real user monitoring
- Traceroute
- Web analytics
- Website audit
- Website tracking
