= Open specifications =

An open specification is a specification created and controlled, in an open process, by an association or a standardization body intending to achieve interoperability and interchangeability. An open specification is not controlled by a single company or individual or by a group with discriminatory membership criteria. Copies of Open Specifications are available free of charge or for a moderate fee and can be implemented under reasonable and non-discriminatory licensing (RAND) terms by all interested parties.

Specifications should not be confused with standards.

Many standards and specification are touted as open while falling short in practice. Many formal bodies charge per-copy fees for the document in order to defer the operating costs of the working group. This is rarely seen as negating the open status of the product, although free electronic distribution is usually seen as preferable.

== Advantages ==
- As there is no restriction among traders which have specific trademark, any traders can apply material satisfying open specifications, hence it creates competition among manufacturers and suppliers.
- Progress of work does not suffer due to short supply of materials.
- Similar kind of material can be procured at competitive rate.
- Reduction of transportation chargers and delivery time.
- Quality of material standardised which results in private parties select materials depending on its quality.
