= Angus Ellis Taylor =

American mathematician (1911–1999)

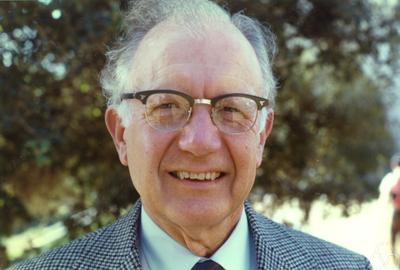
- Born: October 13, 1911; Craig, Colorado, U.S
- Died: April 6, 1999 (aged 87); Berkeley, California, U.S.
- Education: Caltech
- Scientific career
- Fields: Spectral theory
- Workplaces: UCLA; UC Santa Cruz
- Thesis: Analytic Functions in General Analysis (1936)
- Doctoral advisor: Aristotle Michal
- Notable students: Arnold Allen; Peter Swerling; Edward O. Thorp

Angus Ellis Taylor (October 13, 1911 – April 6, 1999) was an American mathematician and professor at various universities in the University of California system. He earned his undergraduate degree at Harvard summa cum laude in 1933 and his PhD at Caltech in 1936 under Aristotle Michal with a dissertation on analytic functions. By 1944 he had risen to full professor at UCLA, whose mathematics department he later chaired (1958–1964). Taylor was also an astute administrator and eventually rose through the UC system to become provost and then chancellor of UC Santa Cruz. He authored a number of mathematical texts, one of which, Advanced Calculus (1955 originally published by Ginn/Blaisdell), became a standard for a generation of mathematics students.

== Books ==
- Taylor, Angus E.; Mann, William Robert (1983). Advanced Calculus (3rd ed.). New York: Wiley. ISBN 978-0-471-02566-5.
- Sherwood, G. E. F.; Taylor, Angus E. (1942; 3rd ed., 1954). Calculus. Prentice-Hall
- Taylor, Angus E.; Lay, David C. (1980). Introduction to functional analysis (2nd ed.). New York: Wiley. ISBN 978-0-471-84646-8. 1st edition. 1958.
- Taylor, Angus E. (2009). Calculus with analytic geometry. Vol. 1. New York: Ishi Press. ISBN 978-0-923891-24-4.
- Taylor, Angus E. (2009). Calculus with analytic geometry. Vol. 2. New York: Ishi Press. ISBN 978-0-923891-25-1.
- Taylor, Angus E. (2009). General theory of functions and integration. Dover books on mathematics (Nachdr. ed.). Mineola, NY: Dover Publ. ISBN 978-0-486-64988-7. 1st edition. Blaisdell. 1965.
- Taylor, Angus E (2000). Speaking freely: a scholar's memoir of experience in the University of California, 1938-1967. Berkeley: Institute of Governmental Studies Press, University of California, Berkeley. ISBN 978-0-87772-393-6.
