= IBM Tivoli Identity Manager =

IBM Tivoli Identity Manager, also known as TIM, ITIM, or ISIM (IBM Security Identity Manager), is an Identity Management System product from IBM.

TIM provides centralized identity lifecycle management. It can automatically create, manage, and delete user access to various system resources, such as files, servers, applications, and more based on job roles or requests.

Other functions include self-provisioning, management of offline accounts, and password vaulting.

== Product History ==
IBM acquired Access360 in 2002, and rebranded their enRole product as TIM 4.4. All later versions of the product are built off this code base. TIM 4.5.1 was released in September 2003. TIM 4.6 was released in July 2005. TIM 5.0, was released in December 2007. TIM 5.1 was released in June 2009.

IBM changed the name of the product to IBM Security Identity Manager (ISIM) with the release of version 6 (IBM Security Identity Manager v6.0) at the end of 2012.

IBM targeted the SME identity management market in 2006 with the release of IBM Tivoli Identity Manager Express.
