= FCR =

FCR may refer to:

== Science and medicine ==
- Fc receptor
- Fire-cracked rock
- Flexor carpi radialis muscle
- Folin–Ciocalteu reagent
- Fuji computed radiography, name of a series of computed radiography systems made by Fujifilm

== Sport ==
- FCR 2001 Duisburg, a German football club
- FC Rauma, a Finnish football club
- FC Remscheid, a German football club
- FC Rosengård, a Swedish football club
- FC Roskilde, a Danish football club
- FC Rouen, a French football club
- Fog City Rollers, a Canadian roller derby league
- Frank Cicci Racing, a NASCAR team
- Full contact rules, in contact sports

== Other uses ==
- Fairy Chess Review, a defunct chess periodical
- False coverage rate
- FCR (company), an American call center
- Federal Court Reports, law reports covering the Federal Court of Australia
- Feed conversion ratio
- Fifth Colvmn Records, a defunct American record label
- Financial condition report
- Fire-control radar
- First call resolution
- Flat-Coated Retriever, a breed of dog
- Flying Carpet (airline), now Med Airways
- Frequency containment reserve, a type of frequency-related ancillary services in power grids
- Frontier Crimes Regulations in Pakistan
- Fulton County Railway, an American railway company
