= IT operations architecture =

Operations architecture allows the ongoing support and management of IT services infrastructure of an enterprise. The IT infrastructure of an enterprise will typically comprise many different systems and platforms, often in different geographic locations. Operations architecture ensures that these systems perform as expected by centrally unifying the control of operational procedures and automating the execution of operational tasks. It also reports the performance of the IT infrastructure. The implementation of an operations architecture consists of a dedicated set of tools and processes which are designed to provide centralisation and automation.

== Scope and context ==
Operations architecture is mainly centered on back office and data center infrastructure rather than desktop computers. It supports a company’s computing infrastructure to provide IT services which are required by business processes. Any organisation with a substantial amount of automated back office processes can have an operations architecture, such as banks, factories and government agencies. The focus of operations architecture is on the day-to-day provision of IT services and it is not concerned with manufacturing IT products such as the programming of applications.

While operations architecture deals with the technical implementation of IT service management, it does not address personnel or human resource aspects. The hiring and training of suitable operators is not managed within the context of operations architecture.

The operations architecture is the technical implementation of an IT governance framework such as ITIL. Specifically, it is the solution design for IT service management. While IT service management focuses on the conceptual design of the IT service, operations architecture focuses on the technical practicalities of implementing this concept.

Geographically, operations architecture unites the control over increasingly disparate and mobile IT systems on a central operations "bridge" (so named in analogy to a ship’s command bridge).

== Elements of operations architecture ==
Some of the most common elements of operations architecture are:

- Production scheduling/monitoring
- System monitoring
- Performance monitoring
- Network monitoring
- Event management
- Secure file transfer
- service level agreements (SLAs)
- operating level agreements (OLAs)
