= DAIS-ITA =

International Technology Alliance in Distributed Analytics and Information Sciences
- Abbreviation: DAIS ITA
- Formation: Sept 21, 2016
- Dissolved: Sept 16, 2021
- Type: Multi-Organization Research Alliance
- Headquarters: IBM
- Region served: U.S. and UK
- U.S. Program Manager: Dinesh Verma
- UK Program Manager: Peter Waggett
- Volunteers: 40
- Website: dais-legacy.org,

The International Technology Alliance in Distributed Analytics and Information Sciences (DAIS-ITA) was a research program initiated by the UK Ministry of Defence (United Kingdom) (MOD) and the US Army Research Laboratory (ARL), in September 2016 and remained active for 5 years until September 2021. It was led by IBM Research in the U.S. and IBM Hursley in the UK. DAIS ITA is the second International Technology Alliance started by the two countries, succeeding the previous ten year alliance NIS-ITA, which was of similar nature.

== Overview ==
The complete name of the alliance is United States/United Kingdom International Technology Alliance in Distributed Analytics and Information Sciences. It was a research group tasked with conducting fundamental research in distributed analytics and information science which affects coalition operations.

DAIS ITA was the second such program supported by collaborative arrangement between U.S. and UK governments. The previous program NIS-ITA ran from 2006-2016, and was also led by IBM. However, the technical scope as well as the composition of the two alliances were very different. The focus of DAIS-ITA was on distributed analytics including distributed AI, while the focus of NIS-ITA was on different types of networks, or network science. The alliance consisted of researchers from United States Army Research Laboratory and Ministry of Defence (United Kingdom) working together with several UK and U.S. based industries and universities to solve fundamental research problems related to distributed analytics.

The DAIS ITA research focused on two technical areas, (i) Dynamic Secure Coalition Information Infrastructures and (ii) Coalition Distributed Analytics and Situational Understanding.

In 2021, the DAIS-ITA received the U.S. – UK Science and Technology Stocktake Team Award.

== History ==
Since approximately 1992, ARL formed a number of partnerships that involved the triad of industry, academia and government. One of them was the Distributed Analytics and Information Science (DAIS) International Technology Alliance (ITA) which was awarded September 21, 2016. The program was to be completed in September 2025.

== Objective ==
The stated objective of DAIS was “to enable secure, dynamic, semantically-aware, distributed analytics for deriving situational understanding in coalition operations.” With US/UK coalition operations becoming increasingly more complex, DAIS sought to address burdens placed on people and technologies that were deployed.

== Research Thrusts ==
The DAIS program was organized around several research thrusts, including the following:

- Distributed Intelligence: Establish the theoretical foundations of multi-faceted distributed networked intelligent systems combining autonomous agents, sensors, tactical super-computing, knowledge bases in the tactical cloud, and human experts.
- Heterogeneous Group Control: Develop the theory and algorithms for control of large autonomous teams with varying levels of heterogeneity and modularity across sensing, computing, platforms, and degree of autonomy.
- Adaptive and Resilient Behaviors: Develop theory and experimental methods for heterogeneous multi-agent groups to carry out tasks in the physical world.

== Members ==
DAIS-ITA consists of several research laboratories and universities in U.S. and UK. These include the U.S. Army Research Laboratories and the UK Defense Science and Technologies as participating Government research laboratories. The non-government members of the alliance in both countries consisted of both industrial and academic research organizations as listed below:

=== U.S. Universities ===
- Pennsylvania State University
- Purdue University
- Stanford University
- University of California, Los Angeles
- University of Massachusetts, Amherst
- Yale University

=== UK Universities ===
- Cardiff University
- Imperial College, London
- University College London
- University of Southampton

=== U.S. Industry ===
- BBN Technologies
- IBM Research - which is the leader of the alliance in the U.S.

=== UK Industry ===
- IBM UK - which is the leader of the alliance in UK
- BAE Systems
- Airbus UK

== Leadership ==
The alliance was led by a team consisting of technical leaders from the U.S. Army Research Laboratory, UK MOD (Dstl), IBM Research in the U.S. and IBM UK.

The following people served in the role of alliance leader listed above:

Organization	Individual
U.S. ARL	Ananthram Swami
UK MOD	Helen Carlton
IBM Research	Dinesh Verma
IBM UK	Peter Waggett

Ananthram Swami took over the CAM role from Greg Cirincione in January 2020. Both of the technical areas is led by a panel of four scientists, one each from the U.S. Army Research Laboratory, UK MOD (Dstl), an academic member of the alliance, and an industrial member of the alliance. The following is a table of researchers who are currently acting in the role of the technical area leaders (TAL) for each of the technical areas within the scope of the research program.

Technical Area	U.S. Govt TAL	UK Govt TAL	Academic TAL	Industry TAL
1. Dynamic Secure Coalition Information Infrastructures	Kevin Chan	John Melrose	Don Towsley (UMass)	Mudhakar Srivatsa (IBM)
2. Coalition Distributed Analytics and Situational Understanding	Lance Kaplan	Gavin Pearson	Alun Preece (Cardiff)	Dave Braines (IBM)

== Results ==
Examples of research results developed by the DAIS program as of 2018 include the following.

- An algorithm that ingested and analyzed data continuously generated over time from geographically distributed sources such as users, sensors and devices.
- Online algorithms for optimal performance of cache management.
- A control algorithm that determined the best trade-off between local update and global parameter aggregation to minimize the loss function under a given resource budget.
