= Hans Kuhn =

Hans Kuhn may refer to:

- Hans Kuhn (chemist) (1919–2012), German chemist
- Hans Kuhn (philologist) (1899–1988), German philologist
