= List of international fellows of the Royal Academy of Engineering =

The Royal Academy of Engineering is the UK national academy in the field of engineering. Its purpose is to bring together the most successful and talented engineers to advance and promote excellence in engineering.

Each year about 50 new fellows are admitted to the academy, after evaluation by the membership committee and election by existing fellows. Engineers who have achieved international distinction in their field, and who are not British citizens or residents, are elected and named as International Fellow and are entitled to use FREng after their names.

== International fellows ==
Recently elected international fellows are shown below.

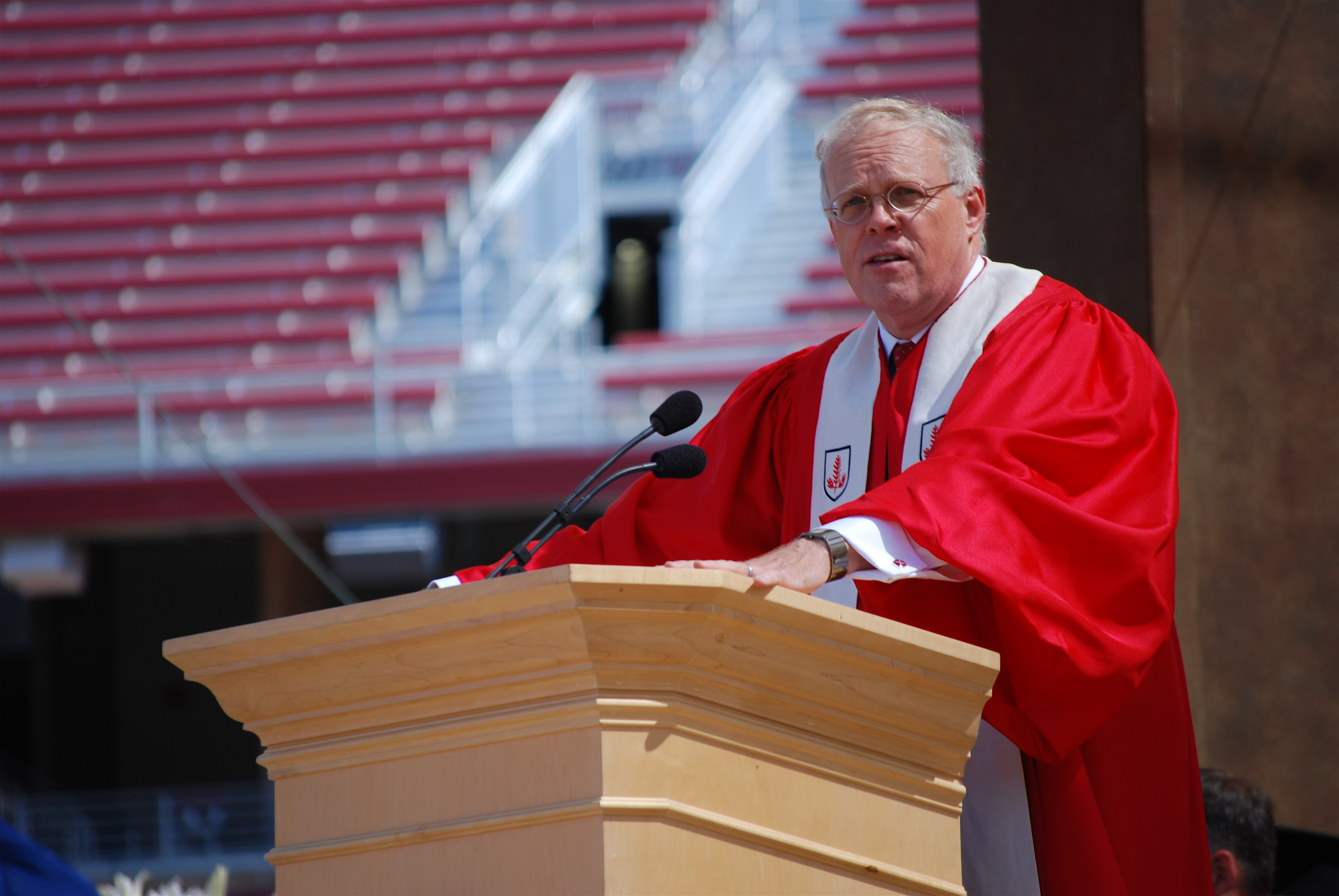
John Hennessy FREng, (United States) ex-President of Stanford University; Pioneer of RISC

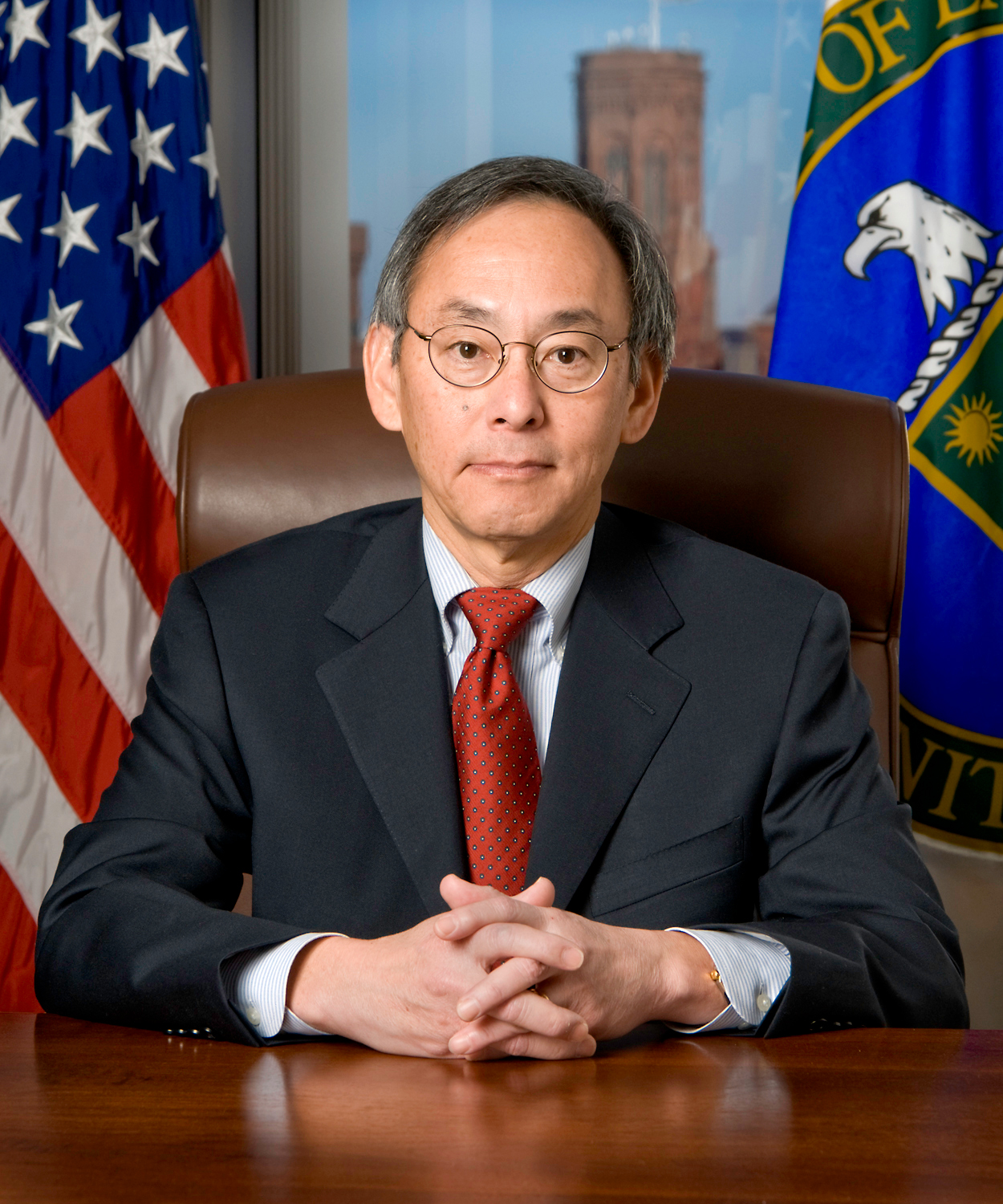
Steven Chu FREng, (United States) Nobel Prize in Physics, Stanford University

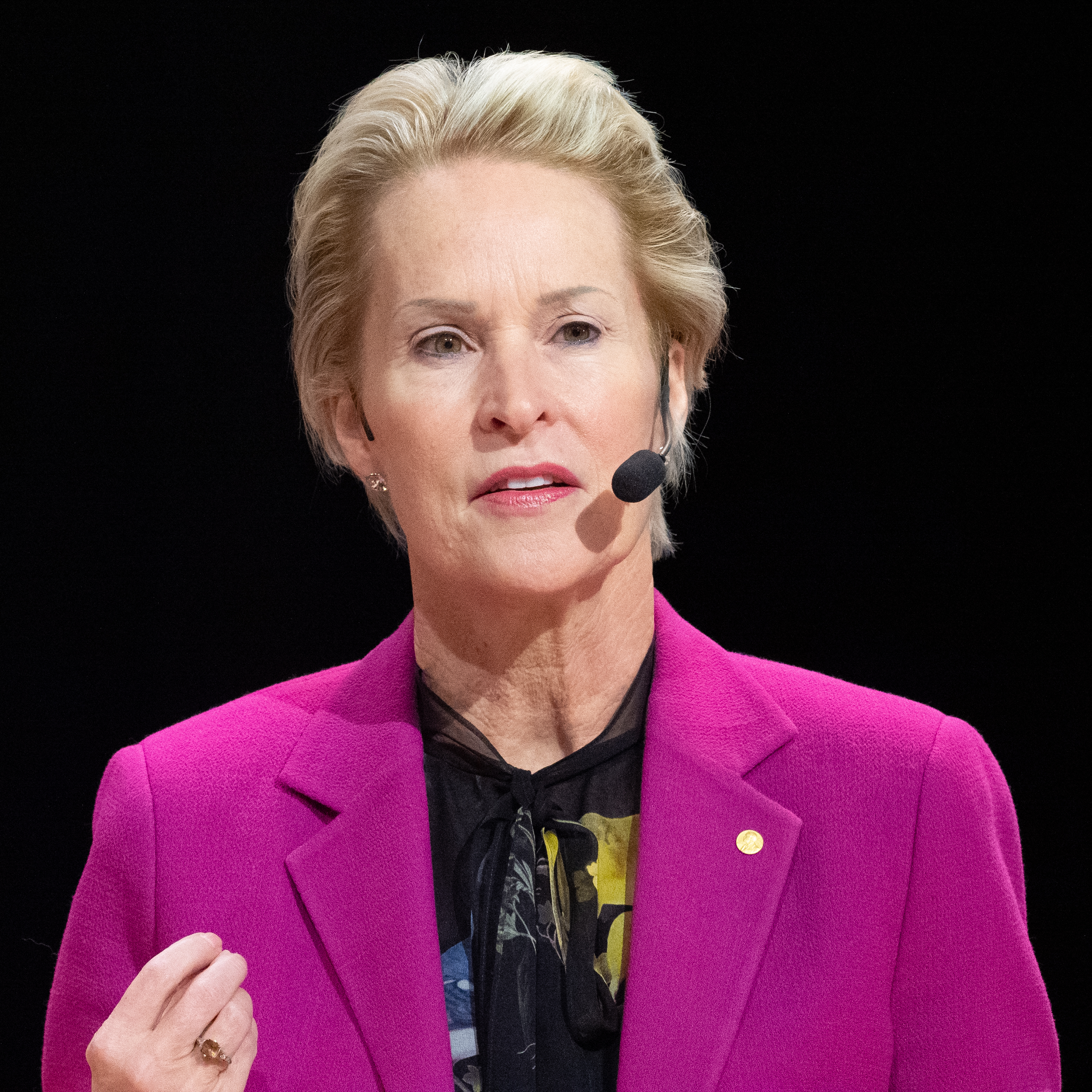
Frances Arnold FREng, (United States) Nobel Prize in Chemistry, Caltech

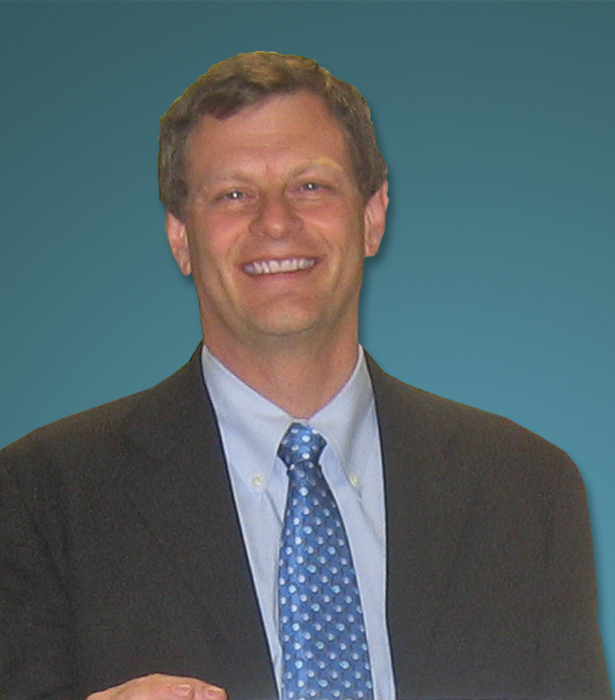
John Cioffi FREng,
(United States) Pioneer of ADSL & VDSL, Stanford University

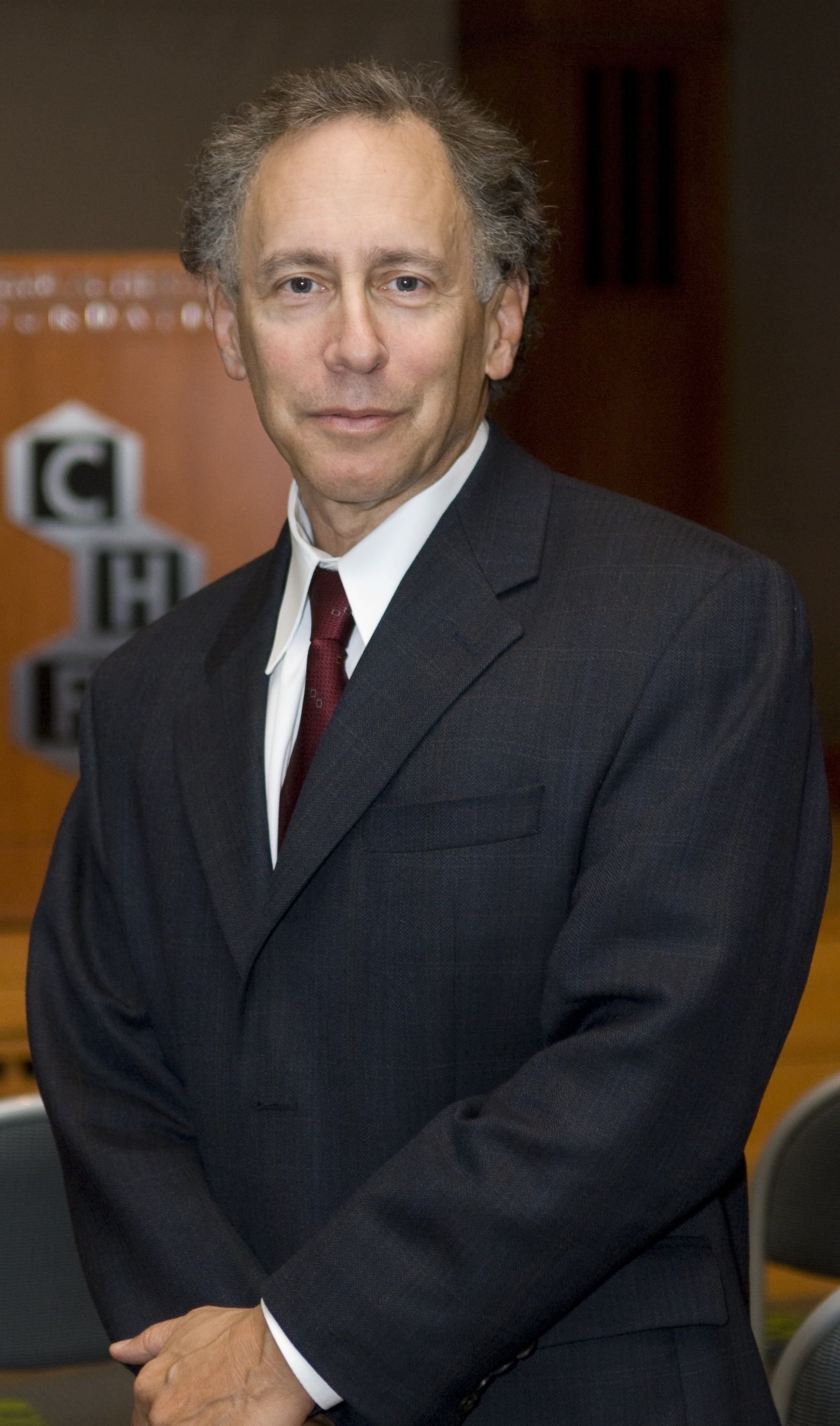
Robert Langer FREng, (United States) Biotech Pioneer, M.I.T.

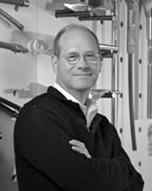
William Baker FREng, (United States) Engineering the Burj Khalifa

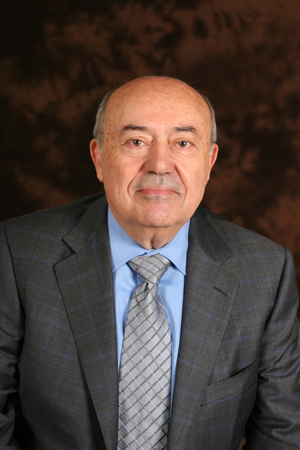
Andrew Viterbi FREng, (United States) Creator of Viterbi algorithm, Qualcomm

Year	Name	Organization	Country
2026	Selda Gunsel	Royal Dutch Shell	(United States) USA
2025	Elsie Effah Kaufmann Ilya Espino de Marotta; Linda Godfrey; Yonggang Huang; Chwee Teck Lim; Muriel Médard; Ranjith Pathegama Gamage; Jin-Guang Teng; Zhong Lin Wang	University of Ghana Panama Canal Authority; Council for Scientific and Industrial Research; Northwestern University; National University of Singapore; Massachusetts Institute of Technology; Monash University; Hong Kong Polytechnic University; Beijing Institute of Nanoenergy and Nanosystems	Ghana Panama; South Africa (United States) USA; Singapore (United States) USA; Australia; Hong Kong; China
2024	Debashish Bhattacharjee Liang-Shih Fan; Waguih Ishak; Timothy Lieuwen; Elaine Oran; Yago Tenorio	Indian Institute of Technology Madras Ohio State University; Stanford University; Georgia Institute of Technology; Texas A&M University; Vodafone Group	India (United States) USA (United States) USA (United States) USA (United States) USA; Spain
2023	Nadine Aubry Pavel Cheben; Dennis Ganendra; Georgios Giannakis; Marlene Kanga; Wolfgang Marquardt; Richard Miller; Viola Vogel	National Academy of Engineering National Research Council; MINCONSULT SDN BHD; University of Minnesota iOmniscient Pty Ltd; Forschungszentrum Jülich; Olin College of Engineering; ETH Zürich	(United States) USA Canada; Malaysia (United States) USA; Australia; Germany (United States) USA; Switzerland
2022	Grazia Vittadini; Kinam Kim; Chennupati Jagadish; Andrea Goldsmith; Rebecca Enonchong; Guangwen Xu; Mallikarjun Tatipamula	Rolls-Royce; Samsung Electronics; Australian National University; Princeton University; Appstech; Shenyang University of Chemical Technology; Ericsson USA	Italy; Korea; Australia (United States) USA (United States) USA; China (United States) USA
2021	Cato T. Laurencin; Alfonso Hing Wan Ngan; Nabeel Agha Riza; Aleida Rios	University of Connecticut; University of Hong Kong; University College Cork; BP	(United States) USA; Hong Kong (Republic of Ireland) Ireland (United States) USA
2020	Pan Hui; Asad M. Madni; Kunasingham Sittampalam	University of Helsinki; University of California, Los Angeles; HSS Engineers Berhad	Finland (United States) USA; Malaysia
2019	Shuji Nakamura; Jeom Kee Paik; Chai Keong Toh; Jianping Wu	U C Santa Barbara; University College London; Gerson Lehrman Group; Tsinghua University	(United States) USA; Korea; Singapore; China
2018	Frances Arnold; Harry Shum; Zhenya Liu; Ji Zhou	California Institute of Technology; Microsoft; State Grid Corporation of China; Chinese Academy of Engineering	(United States) USA (United States) USA; China; China
2017	John L. Hennessy; Chad Holliday	Stanford University; Royal Dutch Shell plc	(United States) USA (United States) USA
2016	Charbel Farhat; Dinesh Verma	Stanford University; IBM	(United States) USA (United States) USA
2015	Manfred Morari; Robert Care; Scott W. Sloan	ETH Zurich; Arup Australasia; University of Newcastle, Australia	(United States) USA; Australia; Australia
2014	William F. Baker; Thomas O'Rourke; Rick Rashid; Andrew Viterbi; Tieniu Tan; Jianyun Zhang; Teck Seng Low	Skidmore, Owings & Merrill; Cornell University; Microsoft Corporation; University of Southern California; Chinese Academy of Sciences; Nanjing Hydraulic Research Institute; National Research Foundation	(United States) USA (United States) USA (United States) USA (United States) USA; China; China; Singapore
2013	Khalid A. Al-Falih; Hans-Jörg Bullinger; Ursula Burns; Carlos Ghosn; Patrick Prendergast	Saudi Aramco; Fraunhofer Society of Applied Research; Xerox Corporation; Nissan and Renault; University of Dublin	Saudi Arabia; Germany (United States) USA; Brazil (Republic of Ireland) Ireland
2012	Tony Gibbs; Shirley Ann Jackson; Allyson Lawless; Michel Virlogeux	Council of Caribbean Engineering Institutions; Rensselaer Polytechnic Institute; Allyson Lawless and Associates; Consultant structural engineer	(Republic of Ireland) Ireland (United States) USA; South Africa; France
2011	Steven Chu; Antonio Gens; Anne Lauvergeon; Jinghai Li; Yiu-Wing Mai; Jie Zhang	United States Department of Energy; Universitat Politècnica de Catalunya; Areva; Chinese Academy of Sciences; University of Sydney; Shanghai Jiao Tong University	(United States) USA; Spain; France; China; Australia; China
2010	Howard J. Bruschi; Robert Langer; Greg Lewin; Kerry Rowe; Charles M. Vest; Alan Eli Willner	Westinghouse Electric Company; Massachusetts Institute of Technology; Sapphire Global Pty Ltd; Queen's University; National Academy of Engineering; University of Southern California	(United States) USA (United States) USA; Australia; Canada (United States) USA (United States) USA
2009	John Cioffi; Vincent Poor; Seeram Ramakrishna	ASSIA, Inc. Princeton University; National University of Singapore	(United States) USA (United States) USA; Singapore
