= Fill rate =

Fillrate or fill rate can refer to:

- Fillrate, a measure of graphics performance
- Service rate, a logistics measure of ordering performance
- Fill rate, a logistics measure of inventory effectiveness at meeting demands
