= Operational-level agreement =

Agreement defining internal support relationships to underpin an SLA

An operational-level agreement (OLA) defines interdependent relationships in support of a service-level agreement (SLA). The agreement describes the responsibilities of each internal support group toward other support groups, including the process and timeframe for delivery of their services. The objective of the OLA is to present a clear, concise and measurable description of the service provider's internal support relationships.

OLA is sometimes expanded to other phrases but they all have the same meaning:

- organizational-level agreement
- operating-level agreement
- operations-level agreement.

OLA is not a substitute for an SLA. The purpose of the OLA is to help ensure that the underpinning activities that are performed by several support team components are aligned to provide the intended SLA. If the underpinning OLA is not in place, it is often very difficult for organizations to go back and engineer agreements between the support teams to deliver the SLA. OLA has to be seen as the foundation of good practice and common agreement.

== See also ==
- IT service management (ITSM)
- ITIL
- Service-level objective (SLO)
