= Viola Vogel =

German biophysicist (born 1959)

- Born: 1959 (age 66–67); Tübingen, West Germany
- Education: Max Planck Institute for Biophysical Chemistry
- Awards: Philip Morris Research Award (2005); Julius Springer Award (2006); NAE Member (2020); NAS Member (2021)
- Scientific career
- Fields: biophysics bioengineering
- Institutions: University of Washington (1990-2003); ETH Zürich (2004-)
- Doctoral advisor: Hans Kuhn

Viola Vogel (born 1959), also known as Viola Vogel-Scheidemann, is a German biophysicist and bioengineer. She is a professor at ETH Zürich, where she is head of the Department of Health Sciences and Technology and leads the Applied Mechanobiology Laboratory. In 2026, she was elected to the American Philosophical Society.

== Biography ==
Vogel was born in 1959 in the university town of Tübingen in the state of Baden-Württemberg, then West Germany. In 1988 she won an Otto Hahn Medal for her doctoral work with Hans Kuhn at the Max Planck Institute for Biophysical Chemistry, Göttingen. In 1990, after two years as a postdoctoral fellow at the Department of Physics at the University of California, Berkeley, she took a faculty position in the Department of Bioengineering at the University of Washington in Seattle where she initiated the molecular bioengineering program. She was subsequently founding director of the Center for Nanotechnology at the University of Washington (1997-2003). In 2004 she relocated to ETH Zürich in Switzerland, first as a professor in the Department of Material Sciences, and later as a founding member of the Department of Health Sciences and Technology (2012). She has been a faculty member of the Wyss Translational Center in Zürich since it began in 2015. Since 2018 she has been an Einstein Visiting Fellow at the Berlin Institute of Health.

In 2020, Vogel was appointed by European Commissioner for Innovation, Research, Culture, Education and Youth Mariya Gabriel to serve on an independent search committee for the next president of the European Research Council (ERC), chaired by Helga Nowotny.

== Research ==
The direction of Vogel's work is to take microscopic pieces of living tissue and investigate their mechanical properties, with a view to developing new technologies. Her interests include molecular self-assembly, cell adhesion, and the construction of biological minerals, materials, and tissues. Her experimental and computational discoveries of how stretching proteins changes their function, and how cells sense and respond to force, have applications in stem cell differentiation, tissue growth and regeneration, angiogenesis, and cancer.

== Awards ==
Vogel won a Philip Morris Research Award in 2005 and shared the Julius Springer Award for Applied Physics in 2006. She was elected to the German Academy of Sciences Leopoldina in 2018, member of US National Academy of Engineering in 2020 and US National Academy of Sciences in 2021. She was elected an International Fellow of the Royal Academy of Engineering in 2023.
