= Stockout =

Depletion of inventory

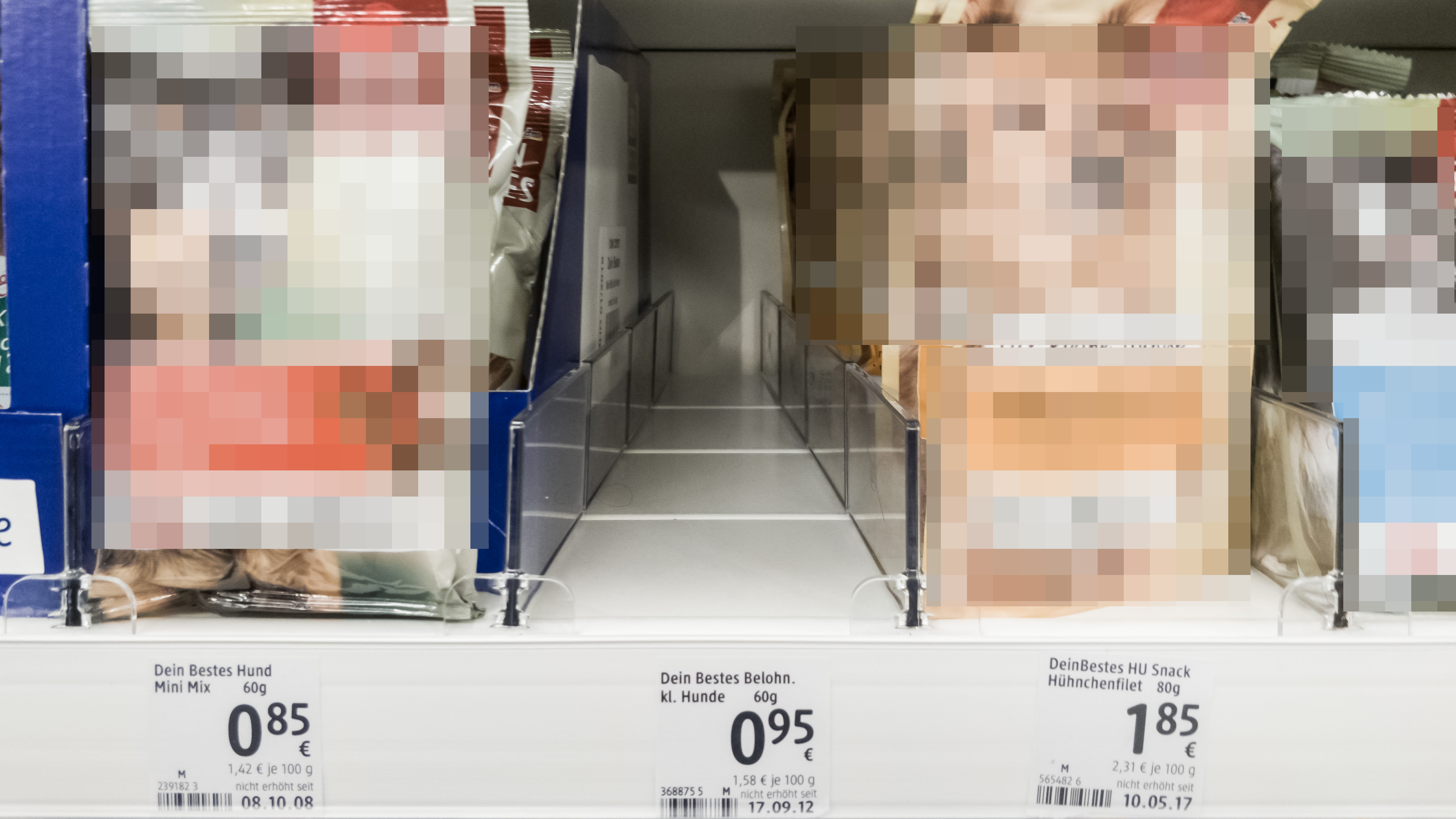
Stockout of dog food

A stockout, or out-of-stock (OOS) event is an event that causes inventory to be exhausted. While out-of-stocks can occur along the entire supply chain, the most visible kind are retail out-of-stocks in the fast-moving consumer goods industry (e.g., sweets, diapers, fruits). Stockouts are the opposite of overstocks, where too much inventory is retained. A backorder is an order placed for an item which is out-of-stock and awaiting fulfillment.

== Extent ==
According to a study by researchers Thomas Gruen and Daniel Corsten, the global average level of out-of-stocks within retail fast-moving consumer goods sector across developed economies was 8.3% in 2008. This means that shoppers would have a 42% chance of fulfilling a ten-item shopping list without encountering a stockout. Despite the initiatives designed to improve the collaboration of retailers and their suppliers, such as Efficient Consumer Response (ECR), and despite the increasing use of new technologies such as radio-frequency identification (RFID) and point-of-sales data analytics, this situation has improved little over the past decades.

Bob Heaney refers to a measure of "out-of-stock frequency", which is measured as the ratio of out-of-stock inventory to average on-hand inventory. Comparisons may be made year-on-year or between competing companies. Heaney notes that market leaders can expect to maintain low levels of out-of-stock frequency.

== Causes ==
Recent surveys on retail out-of-stocks suggest that instore operations are fundamental to reducing retail out-of-stocks. Around 70-90% of stockouts are caused by defective shelf replenishment practices, as opposed to the 10-30% resulting from the upstream supply chain, such as a shortage of supply from a supplier. This broad knowledge offers retailers the opportunity to improve on-shelf availability through internal measures. However, it requires a detailed understanding of the causes of out-of-stocks.

A shortage of working capital may limit the value of orders that can be placed each month. This could be caused by poor cash flow management or other inventory issues such as too much cash tied up in high levels of excess.

== Shopper response ==
Stockouts frustrate shoppers and force them to take a number of corrective actions that are beyond the retailer's control. Understanding how consumers respond to stockouts is therefore the starting point for retailers who wish to improve on-shelf availability. When shoppers are unable to find an item that they had intended to purchase, they might switch stores, purchase substitute items (brand switch, size switch, category switch), postpone their purchase or decide not to buy the item at all. Although these responses differ in severity, each entails negative consequences for retailers. Stockouts cause lost sales, dissatisfy shoppers, diminish store loyalty, jeopardize marketing efforts, and obstruct sales planning, because substitution disguises true demand. Moreover, shopper surveys reveal stockouts to currently be the most prevalent annoyance to shoppers. Shoppers spend a considerable amount of time looking for and asking for out-of-stock items. Shopper response to stockouts has been investigated by researchers with respect to cognitive response (e.g. perceived availability), affective response (e.g. store satisfaction), behavioral response (e.g. brand switching) and aggregated response in terms of category sales effects. Studies find shopper response to out-of stocks depends on brand-related antecedents (e.g. brand equity), product and category-related antecedents (hedonic level), store-related antecedents (e.g. service or price-oriented), shopper-related antecedents (e.g. shopper age) and situational antecedents (e.g. purchase urgency).

== Impact ==
Manufacturers and retailers incur various losses as a result of stockouts, but the extent depends upon customer responses. Both manufacturer and retailer face a direct loss of the potential sale when a consumer faces an out-of-stock if the shopper purchases the item at another store or does not purchase it at all. Additionally, when a substitution is made, the retailer also loses an additional portion of the potential sale because the shopper tends to switch to smaller and/or cheaper substitutes. In addition to the direct losses, both the retailer and the manufacturer incur additional indirect losses due to decreased customer satisfaction that results in less overall reliance on the particular retailers and brands. When an out-of-stock leads to purchase at another store, this provides the consumer an opportunity to try a different store. Consumer behavior theory argues that trial precedes adoption, and, thus, an out-of-stock sets the stage for possible permanent store switching. When an out-of-stock leads to purchase of a competing brand, the consumer trial can lead to possible permanent brand switching as well. Research findings show that a typical retailer loses about 4 percent of sales due to having items out-of-stock. A loss of sales of 4 percent translates into an earnings per share loss of about $0.012 (1.2 cents) for the average firm in the grocery retailing sector, where the average earnings per share, already is about $0.25 (25 cents) per year.

== Identifying and reducing retail out-of-stocks ==
Identification of stock levels can reduce out-of-stocks. The traditional method is to perform a manual audit of the store and manually look for "gaps" on the shelves. Due to differing sales velocities and replenishment schedules, the effectiveness of manual stockout audits depends heavily on their frequency and timing, and on avoiding human counting errors. A second method makes use of point-of-sale data or, more specifically, scanner data. Based upon historical sales data, the latency period between sales is taken as a gauge of whether an item is on the shelf. It is a preferred method for investigating fast-selling retail items, such as soda cans. Out-of-stocks may also be identified by using inventory data, depending on its accuracy. Finally, various types of technology, such as RFID, shelf stoppers and weight or light sensors, can be used. A future-prediction report issued by Accenture in 2015 anticipated that "smart shelves" in stores will detect and report when inventory is running low. However, these technologies are so far not equipped to monitor the condition of the retail items (e.g. undamaged labels).

== See also ==
- Scrum (development)
- Cannibalization
- DMSMS
- Just in time (business)
- Reproductive Health Supplies Coalition
- Safety stock
- Service level
