= Selda Gunsel =

Turkish-American chemical engineer

- Education: Istanbul Technical University (BSc); Pennsylvania State University (MSc, PhD)
- Occupation: Chemical engineer
- Awards: International Fellow of the Royal Academy of Engineering

Selda Gunsel is a Turkish-American chemical engineer. She is currently president of Shell global solutions and vice president (VP) for global commercial technology at Royal Dutch Shell.

== Education ==
Gunsel received her BSc in chemical engineering from Istanbul Technical University and an MSc and PhD in chemical engineering from Pennsylvania State University.

== Research and career ==
Gunsel joined Pennzoil as a research scientist in 1986. While at Pennzoil, she undertook several sabbatical assignments in the Tribology Group at Imperial College London to work with Professor Hugh Spikes. During this time she published several papers on antiwear and viscosity modifier lubricant additives. In 2000, she was appointed VP for Technology Development and Innovation at Pennzoil.

Gunsel moved to Shell in 2002, and has fulfilled a number of roles including; VP of fuels and engine vehicle technology, general manager (GM) of global products and quality, GM of lubricants technology Americas and GM of global strategic R&D. She was appointed to her current role as VP for global commercial technology in 2017. She has also served as both the president of the Society of Tribologists and Lubrication Engineers (STLE) and as the chairman of the Society of Automotive Engineers (SAE) Lubricants Research Award Board.

In 2013, Gunsel was made an honorary professor at the State Key Laboratory of Tribology (SKLT) at Beijing's Tsinghua University. She is a Fellow of the STLE and was awarded the STLE International Award in 2015.

Gunsel was elected as a Member of the US National Academy of Engineering in 2017 for leadership in developing and manufacturing advanced fuels and lubricants to meet growing global energy demand while reducing CO_{2} emissions.

In 2026 Gunsel was elected an International Fellow of the Royal Academy of Engineering.
