= Marlene Kanga =

Australian engineer

Marlene Kanga AO FAA FTSE FREng DEng
- Education: Imperial College London
- Occupation: Engineer
- Known for: Engineering and diversity activism
- Relatives: Zubin Kanga (son)

Marlene Kanga is an Australian engineer, entrepreneur, and diversity champion, who was awarded Queens Birthday honours in 2022. She was appointed an officer of the Order of Australia for her distinguished substantial service to Engineering, particularly as a global leader and role model to women to professional organisations, and to business.

== Education ==
Kanga obtained a Bachelor of Technology at the Indian Institute of Technology, Bombay. She was then awarded a Masters of Science in Chemical Engineering, at Imperial College, University of London, and a PhD at Macquarie University, Sydney.

== Career ==
Kanga is a chemical engineer, who specialised in process and system safety engineering at Imperial College London. She provided significant leadership in the area of process and safety risk engineering in Australia and New Zealand, in high hazard industries. She developed the seminal documents for process safety regulation for New South Wales, adopted throughout Australia that informed similar regulations in New Zealand and Singapore.

Kanga was president of the World Federation of Engineering Organisations in 2017-2019, which represents 100 Engineering institutions and around 30 million engineers around the world. She was a member of the national council of Engineers Australia from 2007 to 2014 and Chair and National President of Engineers Australia in 2013.

As President of WFEO she successfully led the proposal for the UNESCO member states to unanimously declare 4 March, the founding day of the Federation, as World Engineering Day for Sustainable Development, in November 2019, now celebrated around the world.

She led WFEO in collaboration with the International Engineering Alliance for the review of the engineering education benchmarks, the Graduate Attribute and Professional Competency Framework, that underpin the multilateral mutual recognition of engineering education qualifications and professional credentials by the signatories of the Alliance. The review incorporates many significant changes including the need for engineering to consider the impact of their work on the United Nations Sustainable Development Goals, a broader definition of ethics in engineering and a commitment to diverse and inclusive practices.

Kanga established and chairs the WFEO Academy to provide professional development opportunities for engineers around the world, at no cost, and to build engineering capacity and capabilities in the global south south. Kanga is a founding editor, Engineering Education Review, the first English-language journal in engineering education in China, based at Tsinghua University.

Kanga has held a number of leadership roles at Engineers Australia, including national president from 2013-2014, chair of the International Committee from 2014 to 2016 and chair of the National Committee for Women in Engineering in 2008-2009.

She was a vice president of the International Network of Women Engineers and Scientists (INWES) from 2011-2017 and hosted the first INWES Asia Pacific Nation Network meeting in Adelaide in July 2011. This network resulted in nine new women in engineering organisations around Asia and currently has 16 organisation members.

Kanga is a non-executive director of Australian Rail Track Corporation, Standards Australia and Endeavour Energy. She was formerly a non-executive director of the Airservices Australia, BESydney, Sydney Water Corporation, Hearing Cooperative Research centre and a board member of Asialink, Innovation Australia and the NSW Smart Sensor Network. She was chair of the Department of Industry Science and Resources, R&D Incentives Committee, the largest government support program for industry-led R&D in Australia, from 2013-2019.

She is chair of the Institution of Chemical Engineers global Safety Centre that leads process safety engineering practices and co-chair of the Australian government-funded Elevate program Advisory Group. The program aims to increase the participation of women in STEM and is being delivered by the Australian Academy of Technology and Engineering. She is a member of the Centre for Australia India Relations Directors Network, which is facilitating B2B links between Australia and India.

Kanga is a director of iOmniscient, which has developed Artificial Intelligence products for video technologies.

She is Chair of Rux Energy which is developing advanced nanoporous materials for hydrogen storage.

Kanga received an honorary doctorate from the University of New South Wales (UNSW) in 2025.

Kanga is an Honorary Fellow of Engineers Australia an Honorary Fellow of the Institution of Chemical Engineers (UK), an Honorary Fellow of the Federation of Engineering Institutions of Asia and the Pacific (FEIAP) and a fellow (honorary) of the Institution of Engineers India, Mauritius and Engineering New Zealand. She is a Fellow of the Australian Academy of Science, the Australian Academy for Technology Science and Engineering, a Fellow of the Australian Institute of Company Directors a Fellow of the International Science Council (first Australian engineer) and a Foreign Fellow of ASEAN Academy of Engineering and Technology (first Australian engineer). She was elected an International Fellow of the Royal Academy of Engineering in 2023.

== Publications ==
Kanga has published extensively on Engineering, and how to improve organisations by improving and retaining diverse staff, as well as leadership. Some of her select publications include:

- 2015 – Words have the power to lead and transform engineers. M Kanga – Engineers Australia: Civil Edition, 2015.
- 2013 – Laying the foundations for a contemporary organisation. M Kanga – Engineers Australia: Civil Edition, 2013.
- 2011 – Research organisations commit to improving retention of women. M Kanga – Engineers Australia: Civil Edition, 2011.
- 2010 – Increasing participation in leadership. M Kanga – Engineers Australia: Civil Edition, 2010.

== Diversity and equity work ==
Kanga has published and given talks on how to improve diversity in engineering, and been an activist working towards improved equity in STEMM, as well as how to improve innovation.

Kanga was Chair, Engineers Australia National Committee for Women in Engineering in 2008-2009, leading many initiatives including the Year of Women in Engineering in 2007.

As President of WFEO, women gained greater visibility and participation during her term as President and she initiated the international GREE Award for women engineers.

Kanga leads initiatives for women in STEM at UNESCO and the UN. She was a member of the UNESCO STEM and Gender Advancement (SAGA) Project Advisory Group from 2014-2018 that developed guidance for national policies for the women in STEM. She has presented statements on the importance of women in STEM, including to address climate change at the UN.

A former Vice President of the International Network of Women Engineers and Scientists, Kanga hosted its inaugural Asia Pacific Nation Network meeting in 2011 that has grown successfully to 16 women in engineering organisations, including more than 10 that were established since 2011.

Kanga has developed a strategic framework to transform the culture of engineering organisations to be more diverse and inclusive, that emphasises the importance of leadership and which has been used successfully by many organisations.

Kanga also promotes a broad diversity agenda beyond binary definitions of gender for a diverse workforce that is inclusive irrespective of age, ethnicity, sexual orientation and other human characteristics.

She was a member of the Advisory Committee, Chief Executive Women that prepared a report on this topic.

When describing her work, the 2017 president of Engineers Australia commented,

"In what has been a very male dominated forum, Marlene's clarity of vision and purpose won through".

Kanga was one of the only women engineer to receive an AO in 2022, with no other women engineers receiving an AO between 2017 and 2022. She says:

"This recognition is very important, especially as a role model for young people and women and girls, to consider engineering as a career that makes a positive difference for our world. It is also important for Australia to recognise the important contributions that overseas-born Australians can and are making".

In commenting on ways that companies could promote engineering to women, she said:

"It is difficult to promote engineering to women if they are not offered the chance of sustainable, lifelong careers. I cannot truthfully say that they will have wonderful careers when I know they’re going to face so many barriers. What companies need to do is bring women back after they start a family, giving them flexible working and job-sharing opportunities. They need to be encouraged and supported into finding a good work-life balance."

== Recognition and awards ==
- 2025 – Peter Nicoll Russell Medal, Engineers Australia
- 2025 – Fellow of the Australian Academy of Science
- 2025 - Doctor of Engineering, honoris causa, the University of New South Wales (UNSW Sydney), 2025
- 2024 – International Distinction Award, Order of Engineers Portugal
- 2023 – Christian Josef Willenberg Medal, Czech Societies of Technology and Science (CSVTS), Prague
- 2023 – Sydney Metro, Tunnel Boring Machine named after Dr Marlene Kanga, recognizing her contributions to engineering
- 2023 – Ada Lovelace Medal, University of NSW Faculty of Engineering, for outstanding contribution as a woman engineer
- 2023 – International Fellow of the Royal Academy of Engineering
- 2022 – Officer of the Order of Australia, Queen's Birthday Honours
- 2019 – Chemeca Medal for Chemical Engineering in Australia or New Zealand
- 2019 – Top 10 Women Engineers in Australia
- 2018 – Engineers Australia Professional Engineer of the Year
- 2014 – Fellow of the Australian Academy of Technology and Engineering
- 2014 – Member of the Order of Australia
- 2013 – Top 100 Engineers in Australia
