= International Technology Alliance =

The International Technology Alliance (ITA) refers to a series of research programs that were jointly sponsored by UK Ministry of Defence (United Kingdom) and the US Army Research Laboratory (ARL). One such program focusing on network sciences NIS-ITA ran from 2006 to 2016. The other program focusing on distributed analytics DAIS-ITA was initiated in 2016.

== Overview ==
The ITA is a combination of country-specific research programs that are run by ARL and MoD respectively. ARL runs several programs called Collaborative Technology Alliances (CTAs) and the MoD runs equivalent programs, each of which are collaborative research programs involving multiple research institutes and universities. CTA programs are run for the duration of 3–5 years, and usually involve a consortium of industrial research laboratories and universities to team together to solve research problems in a specific domain.

The International Technology Alliance differs from the CTAs in having an international scope spanning two countries, the United States and the United Kingdom. The program focuses on coalition operations, and limits its research explorations to fundamental research in public domain, i.e. work that is intended to be published in academic forums.
