= Financial condition report =

Regulatory report on an insurer's finances

In accounting, a financial condition report (FCR) is a report on the solvency condition of an insurance company that takes into account both the current financial status, as reflected in the balance sheet, and an assessment of the ability of the company to survive future risk scenarios. Risk assessment in an FCR involves dynamic solvency testing, a type of dynamic financial analysis that simulates management response to risk scenarios, to test whether a company could remain solvent in the face of deteriorating economic conditions or major disasters. Dynamic solvency testing may involve both deterministic projections, based on known risks, and stochastic projections that include random risk events.

FCRs are a part of the statutory reporting requirements for life insurance companies in Pakistan, Australia, New Zealand, Ghana and non-life insurance companies in Canada. FCRs are also required in the UK under the Financial Services and Markets Act of 2000 and in Ireland. While many consider FCRs a type of compliance report, they can also be useful for corporate management to identify weaknesses in risk strategy, to test diversification of risk through, e.g., reinsurance, and to set fair market pricing for options.
