= Dinesh Verma =

American scientist and IBM Fellow, FREng

Dinesh Verma FREng
- Citizenship: American (formerly Indian)
- Education: Ph.D.
- Engineering career
- Discipline: Computer Science
- Institutions: IBM
- Employer: IBM
- Projects: DAIS-ITA, NIS-ITA
- Significant advance: Policy-based management
- Awards: IBM Fellow, UK FREng, IEEE Fellow, AAIA Fellow

Dinesh Chandra Verma is an Indian-born American computer scientist. He is an IBM Fellow working at IBM Thomas J Watson Research Center, Yorktown Heights, NY where he conducts research on technologies at the intersection of the Internet of Things, Artificial Intelligence and Distributed Systems. He concurrently serves as the Technical Committee Chair/Chief Technology Officer of Enterprise Neurosystems Group, an open-source consortium focused on distributed enterprise AI.

== Education ==
He received his Bachelor’s in Computer Science from [IIT Kanpur] in 1987, doctorate in Computer Networking from University of California, Berkeley in 1992, and master in Management of Technology from [Brooklyn Polytechnic] in 1998. He joined [IBM Thomas J Watson Research Center] in 1992.

== Technical achievements ==
He has authored several technical papers with his works having a H-index of 50 and an I10-index of 174. He holds over 200 U.S. Patents and has authored multiple technical books and several children’s books to teach Indian languages.

During his doctoral years, Dinesh was one of the early members of the Tenet group formed by Prof. Domenico Ferrari. His work with Ferrari on real-time communications in networks was one of the seminal papers for introducing Quality of Service in computer networks and the foundation (Scheme 0) for much of the work for Tenet research group.

After joining IBM Research, Dinesh pioneered critical advances in the area of policy based management, which radically simplified management of computer systems networks industry-wide, IBM storage area network products, and IBM mainframes by application of symbolic AI methods. This work led to his appointment as an IEEE Fellow.

According to his citation for IBM Fellow nomination, Dinesh is their leading researcher in computer communications networks within IBM, and his significant contributions include an optimizer for Wi-Fi networks, enabling edge applications for cellular networks, and leadership in network science.

Dinesh was instrumental in IBM getting selected to lead the International Technology Alliance in Network Sciences NIS-ITA. As leader of this trans-Atlantic alliance, he made key contributions to areas of Policy-based Security Management and Quality of Information. For the successful leadership of the program and improving research collaboration between the military, industrial and academic research groups of the two countries, he was appointed as an International Fellow of the Royal Academy of Engineering. He transitioned technologies from the program to IBM products including Tivoli Netcool/IMPACT, and Application & Services Platform for Networks (ASPN). Dinesh subsequently led the effort to get IBM selected to lead the DAIS-ITA program which won the 2021 U.S. – UK Science and Technology Stocktake UK Team Award.

Among his many roles at IBM, he has served as head of Distributed AI, CTO of Edge Computing, the strategist for 6G Communications at IBM, manager of IT & Wireless Convergence and as leader of Distributed Cognitive Systems

He is a member of the IBM Academy of Technology and recognized for his patents and a IBM Master Inventor.

== Public Service ==
He is currently serving on the board of Enterprise Neurosystems Group, an open source consortium exploring issues in distributed enterprise AI, as the Technical Working Group Chair. He is serving on the advisory board for University of Delaware. In the past, he served as the chair and vice-chair of the IEEE Technical Committee on Computer Communications and IEEE Computer Society. He was one of the earliest members during the formative stages of Asha for Education. He and his family has authored multiple activity books and easy readers to teach Indian languages to Indian children growing up in America under the imprint of Chanda Books (chandabooks.com).

== Selected awards and honors ==
- Fellow of Asia-Pacific Artificial Intelligence Association, 2023
- International Fellow of the Royal Academy of Engineering, 2016.
- IBM Fellow, 2013.
- IEEE Fellow, 2006 for contributions to communication networks management,
- President’s Gold Medal IIT Kanpur, 1987.
