= FCR (company) =

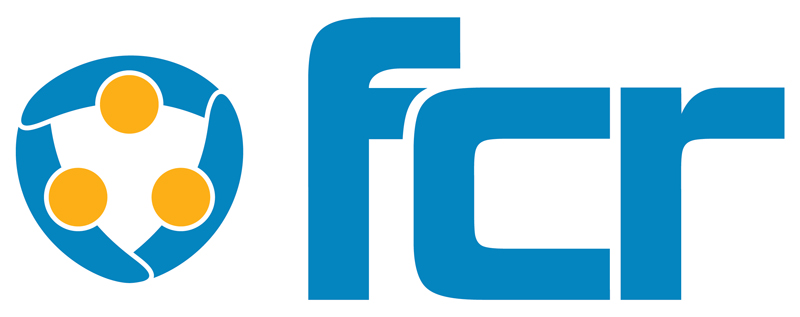
- Formerly: First Call Resolution
- Company type: Private
- Industry: Service
- Predecessor: Comspan Call Center Services (2005-2007)
- Founded: 2005
- Founders: John Stadter, Matthew Achak
- Headquarters: Roseburg, Oregon, US
- Key people: John Stadter, CEO; Matthew Achak, President
- Services: Outsourced call centers
- Number of employees: 2,500
- Website: www.gofcr.com

FCR was an American outsource provider of call centers. Based in Roseburg, Oregon, FCR was founded in 2005 as Comspan Call Center Services, a division of the communications company, Comspan. After the communications company was bought by a Canadian corporation, the call center was established as its own company by Comspan co-founder John Stadter and business partner Matthew Achak.

FCR was at one time one of the fastest growing businesses in Oregon and was named one of the Top Workplaces by The Oregonian for four consecutive years since 2012. FCR was recognized by Forbes.com as a Company To Watch.
