= Service level indicator =

Measure of service quality

In information technology, a service level indicator (SLI) is a measure of the service level provided by a service provider to a customer. SLIs form the basis of service level objectives (SLOs), which in turn form the basis of service level agreements (SLAs); an SLI can also be called an SLA metric (also customer service metric, or simply service metric).

Though every system is different in the services provided, often common SLIs are used. Common SLIs include latency, throughput, availability, and error rate; others include durability (in storage systems), end-to-end latency (for complex data processing systems, especially pipelines), and correctness.
