= Hans Kuhn (chemist) =

Swiss chemist (1919–2012)

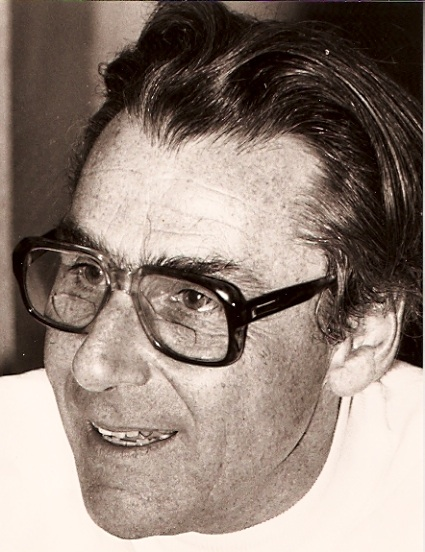
- Hans Kuhn in 1975
- Born: 5 December 1919; Bern, Switzerland
- Died: 25 November 2012 (aged 92)
- Education: ETH Zurich
- Scientific career
- Fields: Chemistry; Biochemistry
- Workplaces: University of Basel; Philipps University of Marburg
- Doctoral advisor: Werner Kuhn

Hans Kuhn (5 December 1919 – 25 November 2012) was a Swiss chemist. He was professor emeritus for physical chemistry and former scientific director at the Max Planck Institute for Biophysical Chemistry (Karl Friedrich Bonhoeffer Institute) in Göttingen.

== Biography ==
Hans Kuhn was born in Bern, Switzerland. He studied chemistry at the ETH Zürich and worked for his doctorate at University of Basel under the guidance of Werner Kuhn (not related). He received his habilitation in 1946. From 1946 until 1947 he worked as a post doctoral fellow with Linus Pauling at Caltech in Pasadena and in 1950 with Niels Bohr in Copenhagen. In 1951, he became professor at the University of Basel. He was appointed in 1953 as professor and director of the Institute of Physical Chemistry of the Philipps University of Marburg where he stayed until 1970. Then he was at the Max Planck Institute for Biophysical Chemistry (Karl Friedrich Bonhoeffer Institute) in Göttingen as director of the department 'Molecular Systems Assembly' until his retirement 1985.

Fritz Peter Schäfer, Peter Fromherz, Horst-Dieter Försterling, Viola Vogel and Dietmar Möbius were among Kuhn's students. Erwin Neher was member in his department 'Molecular Systems Assembly'.

Kuhn married Elsi Hättenschwiler 1948. Their four children. Elsi died 2004.

== Scientific research ==
=== Kuhn and Kuhn ===
Kuhn began to work for his doctorate by investigating decoiling of a random coiled chain molecule in a flowing viscous solvent. Werner Kuhn suggested him to replace the random coil by a dumbbell-model. Kuhn was fascinated by the model's simplicity and by its great success in theoretically analyzing a broad variety of experiments in quantitative terms. This experience and his postdoctoral work with Linus Pauling and Niels Bohr, supported this fascination for powerful simple models and was determining for his life's work in research.

Polymer molecules were described as chains of statistical chain elements. The preferential statistical elements were defined in 1943. Today the preferential element is called Kuhn length (named after Werner Kuhn). Kuhn made experiments with macroscopic models of random coils to describe the behavior in flowing liquids more accurately than based on the dumbbell-model.

=== Free electron molecular orbit model ===
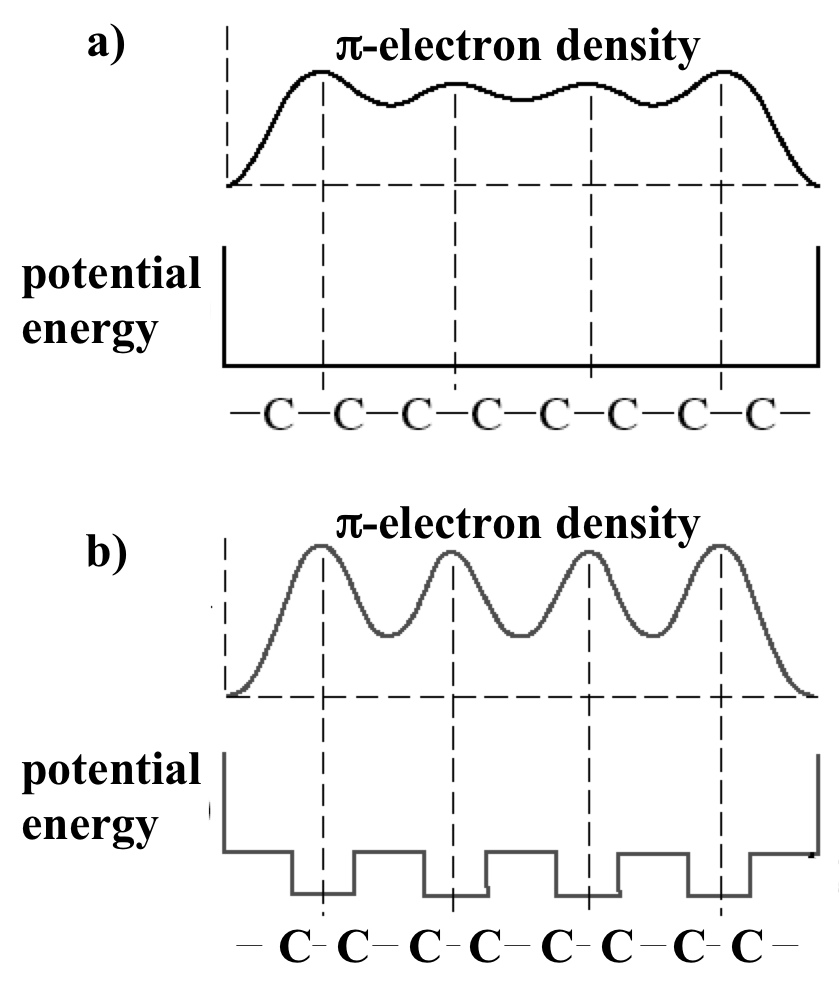
Polyene: potential energy (troughs of the nuclear shells neglected) and π-electron density. a) Instability of equal bonds. b) Stabilized by alternation of single and double bonds (bond length consistent with π-electron density (BCD)-approximation).

In Pauling's lab, Kuhn was trying to understand the color of polyenes by describing π-electrons as particles in a box and he was greatly disappointed - it did not work. Later, when applying the model to cyanine dyes he observed a quantitative agreement with experiment. Today the model is called free electron molecular orbit (FEMO) method. He saw the reason why he had failed in polyenes: an instability when assuming equal bonds leads to an alternation between single- and double-bonds caused by the condition of self-consistency between bond length and π-electron density distribution. He justified this assumption by finding agreement between measured and theoretically predicted absorption spectra. Later this assumption was theoretically verified. This effect is often called Peierls instability: starting from a linear chain of equally spaced atoms Peierls considered first order perturbation theory with Bloch functions showing the instability, but he did not consider the self-consistency resulting in the transition to alternation of single and double bonds. The particular properties of conducting polymers are based on the theoretical relation between bond alternation and equalization. The FEMO and its improvements led to a theory on the light absorption of organic dyes. In Marburg, shortly before the age of digital computers, Kuhn and Fritz Peter Schäfer developed an analog computer to solve the 2-dimensional Schrödinger equation. This room-filling analog computer was applied by Kuhn's research group to calculate bond lengths in π-electron systems.

=== Supramolecular machines ===
Separating and contacting (from a to b and from b to c) in atomic precision. Monolayer of a blue fluorescent dye (donor) on a glass slide partially covered by a monolayer of a red fluorescent dye (acceptor) fixed at a PVA-polymer layer. Energy transfer from donor to acceptor at contact. Courtesy Dietmar Möbius. Reproduced with permission, Wiley-VCH Verlag

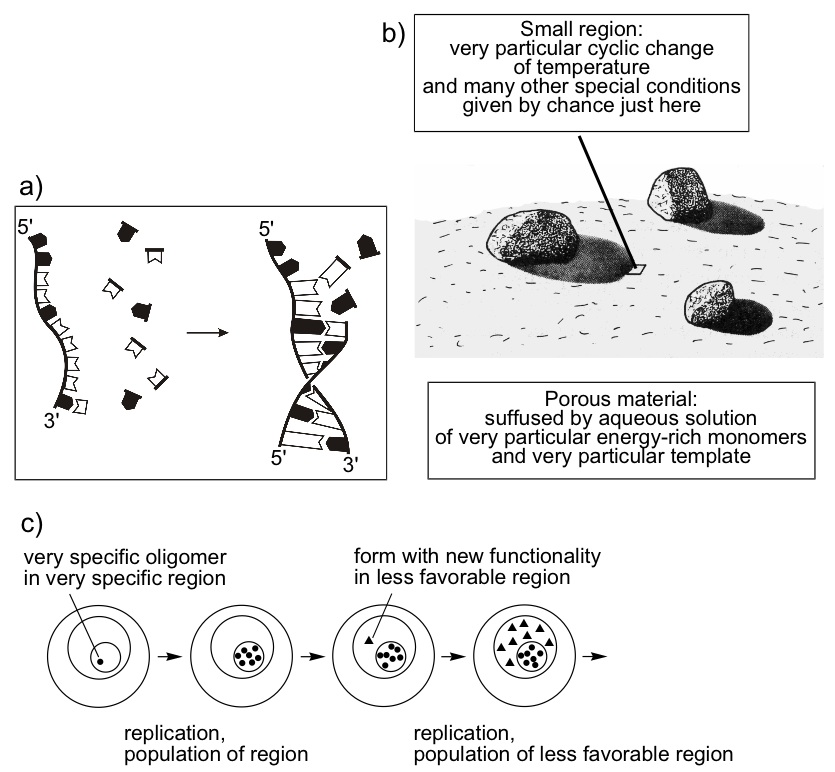
(a) Modeling emergence of first replicating strand (oligomer R). (b) Very particular location on the prebiotioc planet. Arrow: small region, very particular cyclic change of temperature and many other special conditions given by chance just here. (c) Evolution of increasingly complex self-reproducing forms by populating increasingly unfavorable regions.

In the beginning of the 1960s, Kuhn worked on the synthesis of different molecules which fit structurally into each other in such a way that they form planned functional units (supramolecular machines). His research group constructed simple prototypes of supramolecular functional units by advancements of the Langmuir–Blodgett films. Such films are known today under the name Langmuir–Blodgett–Kuhn films (LBK films) or Langmuir–Blodgett–Kuhn (LBK) layers. The many different techniques to manipulate systems of monolayers were developed in close cooperation of Kuhn and his student Dietmar Möbius. Thus the layers should be called Langmuir–Blodgett–Möbius–Kuhn (LBMK) layers.

In close correspondence to the objective of constructing supramolecular functional units he (now at the Max Planck Institute for Biophysical Chemistry in Göttingen) approached theoretically the origin of life: modelling a hypothetical chain of many small physical-chemical steps that leads to the genetic apparatus. Some steps are of particular significance, such as the step initiating the transition from a multiplication and translation apparatus into a multiplication, transcription and translation apparatus. This genetic apparatus agrees in the basic structure and in the mechanism with the biological multiplication and translation apparatus. The skill of the experimentalist building supramolecular machines is replaced in life's origin by very particular conditions given by chance in a very particular location on the prebiotic earth and elsewhere in the universe driving the process.

The unifying paradigm has led to construct supramolecular machines and to invent a pathway leading to an apparatus based on the same mechanism as the genetic apparatus of bio-systems. This required thinking in terms of strongly simplifying theoretical models describing complex situations. Important new methods were invented and developed in several laboratories. This caused a divergence - supramolecular chemistry, molecular electronics, systems chemistry and important contributions to nano-technology. Future research will be based on integrating these topics. Having in mind this coherence is stimulating and will be useful. In Kuhn's view these challenging topics should be included in a modern textbook on physical chemistry.

=== Retirement research ===
During his retirement, Kuhn developed (with his son Christoph and with Horst Dieter Försterling) his early work on π-electron density (a precursor of the density functional theory (DFT)) to a very useful approximation called BCD method (bondlength consistent with total π-electron density method). He contributed in understanding photosynthesis of purple bacteria, the proton pump of halobacterium, and the ATP synthase motor.

== Honours and awards ==
The items of this list are accessible.

- 1949: Werner Preis of the Schweizerische Chemische Gesellschaft (SCG)
- 1967: Corresponding member of the Naturforschende Gesellschaft, Basel
- 1968: Member of the Deutsche Akademie der Naturforscher Leopoldina
- 1972: Liebig Medal of the Society of German Chemists
- 1972: Literaturpreis of the Fonds der Chemischen Industrie (with Horst-Dieter Försterling) for Physikalische Chemie in Experimenten
- 1972: Honorary doctor of Ludwig-Maximilians-Universität München
- 1976: Adolf-Grimme-Preis of the Grimme-Institut
- 1978: Ernst-Hellmut-Vits-Preis of the University of Münster
- 1978: Corresponding member of the Senckenberg Nature Research Society, Frankfurt am Main
- 1979: Paul Karrer Gold Medal Paul Karrer Medaille of the Universität Zürich
- 1979: Member of the Akademie der Wissenschaften und der Literatur
- 1980: Carl-Friedrich-Gauß-Medaille of the Braunschweigische Wissenschaftliche Gesellschaft
- 1983: Corresponding member of the Braunschweigische Wissenschaftliche Gesellschaft
- 1989: Honorary doctor of the Philipps-Universität Marburg
- 1990: Prix Science pour l'Art Moët Hennessy Louis Vuitton S.A.
- 1991: Honorary member of the Deutschen Gesellschaft für Biophysik (DGfB)
- 1992: Honorary doctor of the Université du Québec à Trois-Rivières
- 1994: Bunsen-Denkmünze of the Deutsche Bunsen-Gesellschaft für Physikalische Chemie
- 1997: Honorary member of the Schweizerische Chemische Gesellschaft (SCG).

== See also ==
- Mark–Houwink equation

== Bibliography ==
- The Electron Gas Theory of the Color of Natural and Artificial Dyes. by Hans Kuhn in Progress in the Chemistry of Organic Natural Products ed. Laszlo Zechmeister 16, 169 (1958) and ibid. 17, 404 (1959).
- Praxis der Physikalischen Chemie. Grundlagen, Methoden, Experimente by Horst-Dieter Försterling and Hans Kuhn, 3rd Edition, Wiley-VCH, Weinheim (1991) (ISBN 3-527-28293-9).
- Monolayer assemblies. In Investigations of Surfaces and Interfaces by Hans Kuhn and Dietmar Möbius in Physical Methods of Chemistry Series eds. Bryant William Rossiter and Roger C. Baetzold, Part B, Chapter 6, Vol. 9B, 2nd Edition, Wiley, New York (1993).
- Principles of Physical Chemistry by Hans Kuhn, Horst-Dieter Försterling and David H. Waldeck, 2nd Edition, Wiley, Hoboken (2009) (ISBN 978-0-470-08964-4)
