= Dennis Ganendra =

Malaysian civil engineer and business executive

Dato' Ir. Dr. Dennis Ganendra
- Born: December 1965 (age 60)
- Education: University of Cambridge; Imperial College London
- Occupations: Civil engineer; business executive
- Known for: CEO of Minconsult; founder of Timeless Green; geotechnical engineering; infrastructure leadership
- Honors: FREng, FASc, FICE, FIEM, FIHT

Dato’ Ir. Dr. Dennis Ganendra FREng, FASc, FICE, FIEM, FIHT (born December 1965) is a Malaysian civil engineer and business executive. He is the chief executive officer of Minconsult Sdn Bhd, a multidisciplinary engineering consultancy, and the founder of Timeless Green, a renewable-energy development group. In 2023, he was elected an International Fellow of the Royal Academy of Engineering.

== Early life and education ==
Ganendra was born in December 1965. He completed the Engineering Tripos at the University of Cambridge (Trinity Hall). He later earned an MSc in Soil Mechanics with Distinction from Imperial College London, followed by a PhD in geotechnical engineering focusing on finite element analysis of laterally loaded piles.

== Career ==
Ganendra began his career in geotechnical and civil engineering before joining Minconsult Sdn Bhd, where he held positions including soils engineer, geotechnical engineer, business development manager and director. He later became the company's first chief executive officer. Under his leadership, Minconsult expanded its portfolio to more than 25 countries across five continents, covering airports, highways, rail systems, industrial facilities, energy plants, water treatment projects and high-rise structures. In 2023, Minconsult became the first engineering and construction-sector firm in ASEAN to have Science Based Targets initiative (SBTi)-approved near-term emissions reduction targets.

Ganendra is also the founder of Timeless Green, a renewable energy group focusing on solar PV, biomass, biogas and mini-hydro developments.

Ganendra has contributed to projects involving airports, power plants, water treatment systems, industrial complexes, urban infrastructure and transportation networks. He has delivered lectures locally and internationally and contributed to research in geotechnical modelling and sustainable infrastructure.

== Professional roles and affiliations ==
Between 1998 and 2006, Ganendra served as Honorary Secretary-General of the Road Engineering Association of Asia and Australasia (REAAA), and he continues to sit on its council.

He has served as a director and audit committee member of the Construction Industry Development Board Malaysia (CIDB) and a Trustee of the Construction Research Institute of Malaysia (CREAM) from 2000 to 2008.

Ganendra holds several professional fellowships, of the Royal Academy of Engineering, the Academy of Sciences Malaysia (FASc), the UK Institution of Civil Engineers, the Institution of Engineers, Malaysia (IEM), and the Chartered Institution of Highways and Transportation. He is also a Climate Action Fellow of the UN Global Compact Network Malaysia & Brunei.

== Honours ==
- Darjah Kebesaran Ahli – Sultan Salahuddin Abdul Aziz Shah (2003)
- Knight Companion of the Order of the Crown of Pahang (Darjah Kebesaran Mahkota Pahang Yang Amat Mualia – Peringkat Kedua, Darjah Indera Mahkota Pahang (DIMP)), Title ‘Dato’ (2001)

== Selected publications ==
- Ganendra, D. (1990). Finite Element Analysis of Laterally Loaded Piles. PhD Thesis, Imperial College London.
- Potts, D. M.; Ganendra, D. (1991). “Nonlinear Finite Element Modelling of Laterally Loaded Piles in Overconsolidated Clays.” Numerical Methods in Geomechanics Conference.
- Ganendra, D. (1993). “Elasto-Plastic Modelling Approaches for Lateral Soil–Structure Interaction.” Proceedings of the Institution of Civil Engineers.
- Ganendra, D. (1994). “Constitutive Modelling for Clay Behaviour Under Lateral Loading.” International Journal of Geotechnical Engineering.
- Ganendra, D. (2001). “Infrastructure Privatization in Asia: Engineering, Policy and Implementation Challenges.” Regional Transport Infrastructure Conference.
- Ganendra, D. (2005). “Road Infrastructure Development in Developing Economies: A Malaysian Perspective.” REAAA International Conference.
- Ganendra, D. (2015). “Sustainable Engineering Practices in Multi-Disciplinary Consultancies.” Journal of Sustainable Infrastructure Development.
- Ganendra, D. (2020). “Transitioning ASEAN Infrastructure to Low-Carbon Pathways.” Asia Infrastructure Forum.
