= Yesware =

Sales productivity platform

- Website type: Productivity Plugin
- Available in: English
- Owner: Matthew Bellows
- Website: yesware.com
- Current status: Active

Yesware is a sales productivity platform designed as an ease-of-use assistant for businesses. The company was founded by Matthew Bellows, Rajat Bhargava, and Cashman Andrus. The company has over 800,000 users, including companies like Acquia, Groupon, Zendesk and Square.

== Company history ==
Yesware was founded in 2010 by Matthew Bellows, Rajat Bhargava and Cashman Andrus. Bellows was a salesman by trade, and thought that the solutions at the time were tedious and inefficient in sales, and that the process of copying information into customer relationship management (CRM) systems was tedious and often poorly done. Because of these ideas, Yesware was created in an effort to assist salespeople with common sales tasks, and to extract relevant information for reporting purposes.

In September 2011, Yesware released its beta version and raised a seed round of $1 million led by Google Ventures and the Foundry Group.

Two months after launch, in November 2011, the company had 2,000 registered users. One year later, the number of users grew to 100,000. The growth was attributed to word of mouth and searches within the Google Chrome and iPhone App stores.

That same year, Yesware was awarded the top sales productivity award at the Top Sales & Marketing Awards.

In June 2012, Yesware followed up the seed round with a $4 million Series A round, again including investments from Google Ventures, the Foundry Group and others.

After gaining enough funding, in November 2012, Yesware announced a beta integration with Salesforce, which allowed users to create new contacts, develop tasks, and view actionable reports within Yesware and Salesforce simultaneously.

In 2013, the company attempted to move people from the Basic version of the software, which held most of the users, to the Paid version due to failing to turn a profit. This resulted in a change of roles, where Mike Haylon, a previous salesperson, was promoted to Director of Sales, while Bridget Gleason, having sales experience, was given the role of Vice President of Sales.

== Description ==
Yesware is mainly focused on customer relations and acts as an assistant to salespeople, offering useful features to businesses and companies, such as email scheduling, a meeting booking tool, email tracking, and customizable templates. One of its main selling points is its ability to consistently track customers via email, by integrating with email inboxes, such as Gmail addresses.
