= Outsourcing relationship management =

Business process

Outsourcing relationship management (ORM) is the business discipline widely adopted by companies and public institutions to manage one or more external service providers as part of an outsourcing strategy. ORM is a broadly used term that encompasses elements of organizational structure, management strategy and information technology infrastructure.

== Origin ==
Outsourcing gained prominence as a business strategy in the early to mid-1980s, and was originally driven by the desire to reduce costs in labor-intensive business processes.

Outsourcing relationship management appeared as a specific management discipline in 1999 after an industry consortium, the Sourcing Interests Group, began developing guidelines for its member companies. Following this introduction, the theories of outsourcing relationship management have been developed by numerous global industry groups, universities, consulting/advisory firms and software companies.

== ORM in the enterprise ==
* Enterprise Business Relationships, including ORM

ORM is complementary to other established enterprise management strategies in its relationship to established enterprise resource planning (ERP) tools and the linkage to important business constituents.

- Supply chain management and procurement systems linking to suppliers,
- Human resource management and payroll management systems linking to employees,
- Customer relationship management and sales force automation linking to customers, and
- Outsourcing relationship management linking to external service providers

In his 2004 book "The Outsourcing Revolution", author Michael Corbett discusses the challenges of integrating two separate business entities (the client and the external service provider) across the different organizational boundaries and differing motivations and objectives. More recently, Gartner has launched an outsourcing specialty which has conducted research in this area.

In a 2006 study, IBM identified business model innovation as the most important success factor cited by the 765 global CEOs surveyed. The survey noted that "fully 65 percent of chief executives and other leaders say they will have to make fundamental changes in their businesses over the next two years. New products and services remain a priority, but they’re placing increasing emphasis on differentiating themselves through innovation in the basics of their business models. They believe that external collaboration across their business ecosystems will yield a multitude of innovative ideas."

There are three aspects of ORM which companies typically pursue as part of their outsourcing strategy:

- Management Strategy - determining the most appropriate combination of contractual terms (service level agreement) and relationship management techniques
- Organizational Structure - building the appropriate in-house management/oversight structure and mechanisms
- IT Infrastructure - the supporting infrastructure to enable the monitoring and management of a network of external service providers

=== Management strategy ===
A 2002 Computerworld article documented the need for managers skilled in ORM for managing IT outsourcing. A 2007 article in DM Review pointed out that there was still a need for specialized outsourcing relationship managers and cited this as a career opportunity.

Carnegie Mellon University developed a Sourcing Capability Model to measure the maturity and skills required for effective outsourcing relationship management. The University of Michigan sponsors research and events focused on the challenges and management strategies for successful outsourcing.

In early 2007, a CIO Magazine article explores this trend.

One study by Vantage Partners (Boston, MA) found that at least 15 percent of the total outsourcing contract value is at stake if outsourcing governance is not managed well. In the book, "Multisourcing," Gartner analysts point out that successful outsourcing is built on "a network of relationships, not transactions," and outsourcing governance is the most important factor in determining the success of an outsourcing engagement. Gartner found that fewer than 30 percent of enterprises have formal sourcing strategies and appropriate outsourcing governance mechanisms in place. In a 2004 survey of 130 CIOs, 42 percent said they were dissatisfied with their outsourcing relationships, according to outsourcing advisory company EquaTerra, primarily due to poorly developed, underbudgeted and undersourced governance models.

== See also ==
- Customer relationship management (CRM)
- Enterprise resource planning (ERP)
- Business intelligence (BI)
- Business process outsourcing (BPO)
- On-demand outsourcing
- Supply chain management (SCM)
- Vendor relationship management (VRM)
