= Airbus UK =

Subsidiary of Airbus

Airbus UK Limited
- Type: Private
- Industry: Aerospace
- Founded: 20 November 1997; 28 years ago
- Headquarters: Bristol, United Kingdom
- Key people: Katherine Bennett CBE (senior vice-president)
- Products: Aerostructures
- Revenue: £2,068 million (2005)
- Number of employees: 10,135 (2005)
- Parent: Airbus
- Website: www.airbus.com/company/worldwide-presence/airbus-in-uk/

Airbus UK (formerly EADS UK) is a wholly owned subsidiary of Airbus, based in the United Kingdom, which produces wings for Airbus aircraft in France at their main hub in Toulouse. When Airbus (at the time known as EADS) was incorporated as a joint-stock company in 2001, BAE Systems transferred the British facilities of the transnational Airbus Industrie GIE consortium formed in 1970 to the new corporation in exchange of a 20% stake in it. These facilities, together, formed the entity called EADS UK. In 2006, EADS ended up acquiring BAE's 20% minority stake; EADS UK thus became a wholly owned subsidiary of the company. In 2015, EADS was rebranded "Airbus", and so were its divisions and many of its subsidiaries as a result, including EADS UK.

Airbus UK has three main sites responsible for the design and manufacture of the high-technology wings for all Airbus models as well as overall design and supply of the fuel system. For most Airbus models, the company is responsible for overall design and supply of landing gear. The company employs around 13,000 people at two sites: Filton, where the engineering and design activity takes place along with some manufacturing, and Broughton, where other major wing component manufacturing and all wing assembly takes place. Airbus recently acquired part of Spirit Aerosystems in Belfast that manufactured the wings of the A220 in order to maintain their supply chain.

== History ==
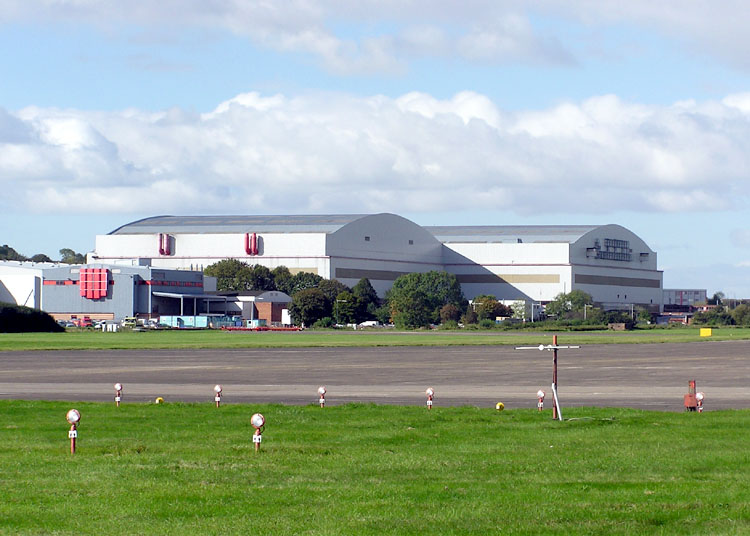
Airbus UK (Filton)

Hawker Siddeley (which merged with British Aircraft Corporation (BAC) in 1977 to form British Aerospace) was part of the first Airbus project, the Airbus A300. The British government withdrew support in 1969 but Hawker Siddeley was allowed to continue as supplier of the aircraft's wings due to the advanced stages of design and the reluctance of other nations to take over the wing design. In 1979 BAe rejoined the Airbus Industrie GIE consortium. In 2001, after the merger of Airbus Industrie GIE's French and German parent companies, which led to the formation of EADS (now rebranded Airbus), it became Airbus S.A.S., the Airbus Integrated Company; a subsidiary majority-owned by EADS in which the newly formed BAE Systems (British Aerospace and Marconi Electronic Systems merger in 1999) held a 20% minority share.

Airbus UK started work on the wings for the Airbus A380 in August 2002.

In April 2006 BAE Systems announced its intention to sell its share of Airbus SAS to EADS. BAE originally sought to agree a price with EADS through an informal process. However, due to the slow pace of negotiations and disagreements over price, BAE exercised its put option which saw investment bank Rothschild appointed to give an independent valuation.

On 2 July 2006 Rothschild valued BAE's stake at £1.9 billion (€2.75 billion); well below the expectation of BAE, analysts and even EADS. On 5 July 2006 BAE appointed independent auditors to study why the value of its share of Airbus had fallen from the original estimates to the Rothschild valuation. On 6 September 2006 BAE agreed to sell its stake in Airbus to EADS for £1.87 billion (€2.75 billion, $3.53 billion), pending BAE shareholder approval. On 4 October shareholders voted in favour of the sale.

== Sites ==
Airbus wing design and production was assigned to UK largely because of the advanced wing design of Hawker Siddeley Trident (D.H.121), designed by De Havilland. In the early days of Airbus, De Havilland design teams based in Hatfield worked on Airbus wing design and wing assembly was carried out in Broughton (a De Havilland manufacturing site). After Hawker Siddeley (the parent company of De Havilland) had become part of British Aerospace, the Hatfield site was closed. From the 1990s onwards, Airbus design work has been carried out at the Filton site, which was originally the Bristol Aeroplane Company.

=== Filton ===
The Filton site is located on the former Bristol Aeroplane Company site, which was later used as the final assembly line for the British-built Concorde aircraft (the French-built Concordes were assembled in Toulouse, which is also now an Airbus site).

Airbus Filton employed over 4,500 people in a variety of roles as of 2011. The site is responsible for the design of the wing structure, fuel systems and landing gear integration. Some manufacturing also takes place in Filton, including the wing assembly for the A400M. Aerodynamics work, research and testing is also carried out. In 2008, Airbus sold most of the component manufacturing activities on the Filton site to GKN, which continues to use these facilities to manufacture Airbus parts as a subcontractor. In 2011 Airbus announced the construction of a new office complex, referred to as the "Aerospace Park", at the Filton site.

=== Broughton ===
The current Airbus Broughton site was founded in 1939 as a shadow factory for the production of the Vickers Wellington and the Avro Lancaster. After the War De Havilland took over the factory and it was used to produce various aircraft, including the Mosquito and the Comet.

In 2011, Airbus Broughton employed more than 6,500 people, mostly in manufacturing roles. The site is responsible for the wing assembly for all Airbus aircraft, with the exception of the Chinese A320s (these wings are assembled in China), the A220 (assembled in Belfast), and the A400M (assembled in Filton). Airbus wings are transported by Airbus Beluga or Airbus BelugaXL to the final assembly lines at Airbus Hamburg Finkenwerder and Arbus Toulouse.

== Aircraft ==
- Airbus A220
- Airbus A300 (production ceased)
- Airbus A310 (production ceased)
- Airbus A310 MRTT
- Airbus A320 family
- Airbus A330
- Airbus A330 MRTT
- Airbus A340 (production ceased)
- Airbus A350
- Airbus A380 (production ceased)
- Airbus A400M
- Airbus Beluga

== See also ==
- Airbus UK Broughton F.C., an Airbus UK football club based in Wales.
