= First call resolution =

Call center service metric

First call resolution or first contact resolution (FCR) is a metric that measures a call center's performance for resolving customer interactions on the first call or contact, eliminating the need for follow-up contacts. FCR is one of the most-watched metrics and considered the most important call center industry metric. Ideally, the FCR definition means no repeat calls or contacts are required from the initial call or contact reason from a customer perspective.

The difference between first call resolution and first contact resolution is the contact channels measured for FCR (e.g., interactive voice response, chat, email, website, call center). The first call resolution metric name measures FCR for a call center. The first contact resolution metric name measures FCR for any contact channel.

There are numerous external and internal methods for measuring FCR. Internal methods measuring operational performance include agent logging, speech analytics, quality monitoring, reopened issues, and counting repeat call volume. External methods measuring FCR and customer satisfaction include post-call surveys. "No repeat calls" in a given timeframe and "post-call survey" FCR measurement methods have not only been used for over two decades but continue to be the most popular methods used by call centers for measuring FCR.

Ideally, FCR is determined based on the perspective of the customer. This is because the customer's opinion is what matters the most as the customer is the only one who is going to know whether their issue was resolved.

== Overview ==
The origins of FCR started in an inbound call center. Originally, the FCR rate was measured only on voice calls but has expanded to all contact channels (e.g., email, interactive voice response, chat, website, call center, social media). The FCR metric has been used in the call center industry for over 25 years and continues to be a prevalent call center metric.

Nearly a decade ago, the start of customer relationship management ended the old days of "measure everything that moves". Call centers have a wide range of available statistics and data to analyze customer experience (CX). Top call centers realize that to be successful, they must find the metrics that truly impact CX and reveal the key insights. Research suggests that no single key performance indicator (KPI) has a bigger impact on customer satisfaction than FCR; customer satisfaction drops an average of 15% (top box response) with each callback a customer must make to a call center.

The call center industry average for FCR using the external FCR measurement method of a post-call survey is 70% which means that 30% of customers must call back about the same call reason for the average call center. An FCR rate considered good is 70% to 75%. FCR rates can also vary by industry, call complexity, and segment. Research shows that 60% of companies measuring FCR for 1+ years report a 1% to 30% improvement in their performance.

FCR is an indicator of improving customer journey metrics (e.g., customer satisfaction), operating cost metrics (e.g., cost per call for resolution), and business outcome metrics (e.g., net promoter score, net retention index). For example, research shows for every 1% improvement in FCR, there is a 1% improvement in customer satisfaction. Research also shows for every 1% improvement in FCR increases transactional net promoter score by 1.4 points. When FCR performance is low or high, so are the performances of customer satisfaction and referrals and a reduction in cost and customer defections.

Research shows that majority (93%) of customers expect their call to be resolved on the first call. Why does FCR stand out with all the possible ways of viewing call center performance? It gives insight into a call center interaction through the customers' perspective. Most people do not enjoy making repeated calls or contacts to address issues because they want to resolve their calls on the first call.

There are a number of challenges in measuring first call resolution. The challenge still exists today as to how to define and measure FCR accurately, effectively, and efficiently. Since defining and measuring FCR is open for interpretation, there is no consistent process to measure this critically important KPI. Some call centers report 90 to 95 percent FCR rates, yet it raises a red flag when FCR is that high. Perhaps the calls being resolved should not be handled by phone initially, as the customer's call could have been resolved using a self-serve contact channel.

== Criticism ==
Many call center leaders consider the FCR metric difficult to measure because it is complex. There is no internal FCR measurement industry standard, which hinders the accuracy of the FCR measurement and the benchmarking of FCR against other call centers. Internal FCR measurement uses no repeat call in a given time frame criteria for determining an organization’s FCR rate. This approach can overstate the FCR rate by 10% to 20% higher than the external FCR measurement (e.g., post-call survey).

Even though call center leaders have identified FCR as a critical KPI, there is some question about what exactly constitutes a "resolved call." Some call centers consider a call resolved if the agent didn't need to transfer it. Other call centers determine if a call is resolved if there is no follow-up work needed by the customer after the call. Internal FCR is determined based on whether the customer called back for the same issue within 1 to 30 days. Determining the appropriate callback time can be difficult, and as a result, there is no industry standard for internal FCR measurement, making the FCR rate less accurate for benchmarking against other call centers.
