= Nastel =

Nastel Technologies
- Type: Private
- Industry: IT Management Software
- Founded: 1994; 32 years ago
- Founder: David Mavashev
- Headquarters: Plainview, New York
- Website: meshiq.com

Nastel Technologies is an American information technology (IT) monitoring company that sells software for Artificial Intelligent IT Operations (AIOps), monitoring and managing middleware, transaction tracking and tracing, IT Operational Analytics (ITOA), Decision Support Systems (DSS) business transaction management (BTM) and application performance management (APM). The company is headquartered in Plainview, New York.

== History ==
Nastel Technologies was founded in 1994 by David Mavashev to provide monitoring and administration of messaging middleware technologies. Nastel has since broadened its coverage, based on a complex event processing ("CEP") engine, to support the five dimensions of APM, defined by the Gartner Group, including coverage for: Java, .NET, CICS, Web Services and other technologies and to handle the integration of its monitoring technology with a typical Forbes Global 2000 company’s existing IT monitoring software.

In 2023, Nastel Technologies rebranded as meshIQ after receiving an investment from Software Growth Partners (SGP).

== Products ==
Nastel Technologies delivers three main products: Nastel AutoPilot, Nastel Navigator and Nastel XRay.

Nastel AutoPilot is software for real-time monitoring of the availability and performance of business applications. Using complex event processing and business transaction management, it provides real-time visibility of applications, middleware and transactions, as well as predictive alerting.

Nastel Navigator provides Middleware management for a multitude of different middleware platforms including Solace, IBM (WebSphere MQ), TIBCO, and Kafka. This allows for daily management functions to be delivered simply and securely, including migrations, queue management, upgrades, and updates, as well as allowing middleware operators to set up secure methods for middleware users to manage their own queues.

Nastel XRay is a machine-data analytics platform that encompasses a broad array of machine learning algorithms to deliver predictive analysis and automation that helps IT and the business operate more effectively.

In Feb. 2023, when Nastel Technologies rebranded as meshIQ, the company's focus expanded to delivering an observability platform for integration MESH (Messaging, Event Processing, Streaming platforms deployed across Hybrid cloud).

== See also ==
- AppDynamics
- AppNeta
- CA, Inc.
- Computer Associates
- Dynatrace
- Instana
- New Relic
- Riverbed Technology
- Splunk
