= SIGOS =

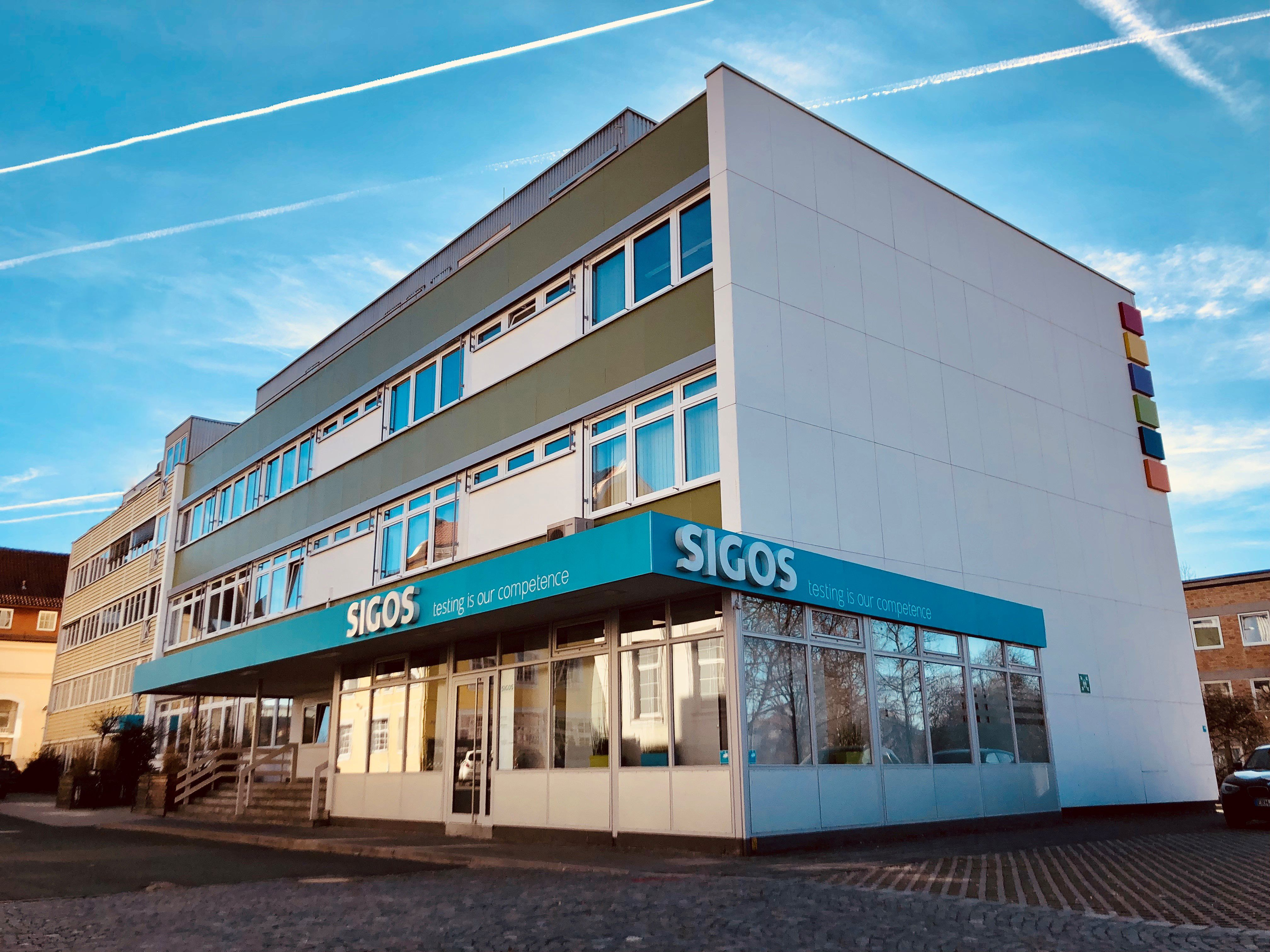
- SIGOS Headquarters in Nuremberg Germany
- Company type: Private
- Industry: Telecoms
- Founded: 1989
- Defunct: 2020
- Headquarters: Nuremberg, Nuremberg, Germany
- Number of locations: 4
- Key people: Orathi (CEO); Andrew (CFO)
- Owner: Audax Private Equity
- Number of employees: 1800 (2020)
- Parent: Mobileum
- Website: sigos.com

SIGOS was a German-based company that provided active testing and fraud detection software for telecommunication companies, governmental instances (regulators), banks and automobile manufacturers. SIGOS had its headquarters in Nuremberg, Germany. Other offices were located in Ghent, Belgium, in Singapore and in San Mateo, California.

Their last annual conference was held at Messe in the former headquarters' hometown Nuremberg in July 2018.

== History ==
The company was founded in 1989. In April 2006, the US based Keynote Systems acquired SIGOS for US$30 million, renaming it 'Keynote SIGOS'.

In June 2015, SIGOS' owner Keynote Systems merged with Dynatrace, the latter having John Van Siclen as acting CEO.

In January 2016, Keynote SIGOS acquired Keynote DeviceAnywhere, a company located in San Mateo, California that is specialised in testing of mobile applications (apps). They rebranded the DeviceAnywhere product as 'App Experience' (abbreviated AppEx) shortly afterwards.

In 2017, the company's name was simplified into SIGOS.

In July 2020, SIGOS was taken over by Mobileum who had already acquired WeDo Technologies earlier on in 2019. The SIGOS portfolio was integrated within the Mobileum offering under the Testing and Service Assurance banner.
