= Puentes =

Puentes is a surname. Notable people with the surname include:

- Adonis Puentes (born 1974), Cuban-Canadian singer-songwriter
- Adrián Puentes (born 1988), Cuban archer
- Germán Puentes (born 1972), Spanish tennis player

== See also ==
- Fuentes (surname)
- Puente (surname)
