= IT operations analytics =

In the fields of information technology (IT) and systems management, IT operations analytics (ITOA) is an approach or method to retrieve, analyze, and report data for IT operations. ITOA may apply big data analytics to large datasets to produce business insights. In 2014, Gartner predicted its use might increase revenue or reduce costs. By 2017, it predicted that 15% of enterprises will use IT operations analytics technologies.

== Definition ==
IT operations analytics (ITOA) (also known as advanced operational analytics, or IT data analytics) technologies are primarily used to discover complex patterns in high volumes of often "noisy" IT system availability and performance data. Forrester Research defined IT analytics as "The use of mathematical algorithms and other innovations to extract meaningful information from the sea of raw data collected by management and monitoring technologies." Note, ITOA is different than AIOps, which focuses on applying artificial intelligence and machine learning to the applications of ITOA.

== History ==
Operations research as a discipline emerged from the Second World War to improve military efficiency and decision-making on the battlefield. However, only with the emergence of machine learning tech in the early 2000s could an artificially intelligent operational analytics platform actually begin to engage in the high-level pattern recognition that could adequately serve business needs. A critical catalyst towards ITOA development was the rise of Google, which pioneered a predictive analytics model that represented the first attempt to read into patterns of human behavior on the Internet. IT specialists then applied predictive analytics to the IT Industry, coming forward with platforms that can sift through data to generate insights without the need for human intervention.

Due to the mainstream embrace of cloud computing and the increasing desire for businesses to adopt more big data practices, the ITOA industry has grown significantly since 2010. A 2016 ExtraHop survey of large and mid-size corporations indicates that 65 percent of the businesses surveyed will seek to integrate their data silos either this year or the next. The current goals of ITOA platforms are to improve the accuracy of their APM services, facilitate better integration with the data, and to enhance their predictive analytics capabilities.

== Applications ==
ITOA systems tend to be used by IT operations teams, and Gartner describes seven applications of ITOA systems:

- Root cause analysis: The models, structures and pattern descriptions of IT infrastructure or application stack being monitored can help users pinpoint fine-grained and previously unknown root causes of overall system behavior pathologies.
- Proactive control of service performance and availability: Predicts future system states and the impact of those states on performance.
- Problem assignment: Determines how problems may be resolved or, at least, direct the results of inferences to the most appropriate individuals, or communities in the enterprise for problem resolution.
- Service impact analysis: When multiple root causes are known, the analytics system's output is used to determine and rank the relative impact, so that resources can be devoted to correcting the fault in the most timely and cost-effective way possible.
- Complement best-of-breed technology: The models, structures and pattern descriptions of IT infrastructure or application stack being monitored are used to correct or extend the outputs of other discovery-oriented tools to improve the fidelity of information used in operational tasks (e.g., service dependency maps, application runtime architecture topologies, network topologies).
- Real time application behavior learning: Learns & correlates the behavior of Application based on user pattern and underlying Infrastructure on various application patterns, create metrics of such correlated patterns and store it for further analysis.
- Dynamically baselines threshold: Learns behavior of Infrastructure on various application user patterns and determines the Optimal behavior of the Infra and technological components, bench marks and baselines the low and high water mark for the specific environments and dynamically changes the bench mark baselines with the changing infra and user patterns without any manual intervention.

== Types ==
In their Data Growth Demands a Single, Architected IT Operations Analytics Platform, Gartner Research describes five types of analytics technologies:

- Log analysis
- Unstructured text indexing, search and inference (UTISI)
- Topological analysis (TA)
- Multidimensional database search and analysis (MDSA)
- Complex operations event processing (COEP)
- Statistical pattern discovery and recognition (SPDR)

== Tools and ITOA platforms ==
A number of vendors operate in the ITOA space:

- AppDynamics
- BMC
- CA
- Dynatrace
- Elastic
- EMC
- Evolven
- ExtraHop Networks
- HP
- IBM
- Micro Focus
- Nastel
- NetApp
- Oracle
- Riverbed
- SAP SE
- ScienceLogic
- SignalFx
- SolarWinds
- Splunk
- Sumo Logic
- TeamQuest
- VMTurbo
- VMware

== See also ==
- Application performance management
- Big data
- Business intelligence tools
- Information technology operations
