= IWA OutdoorClassics =

German arms trade show

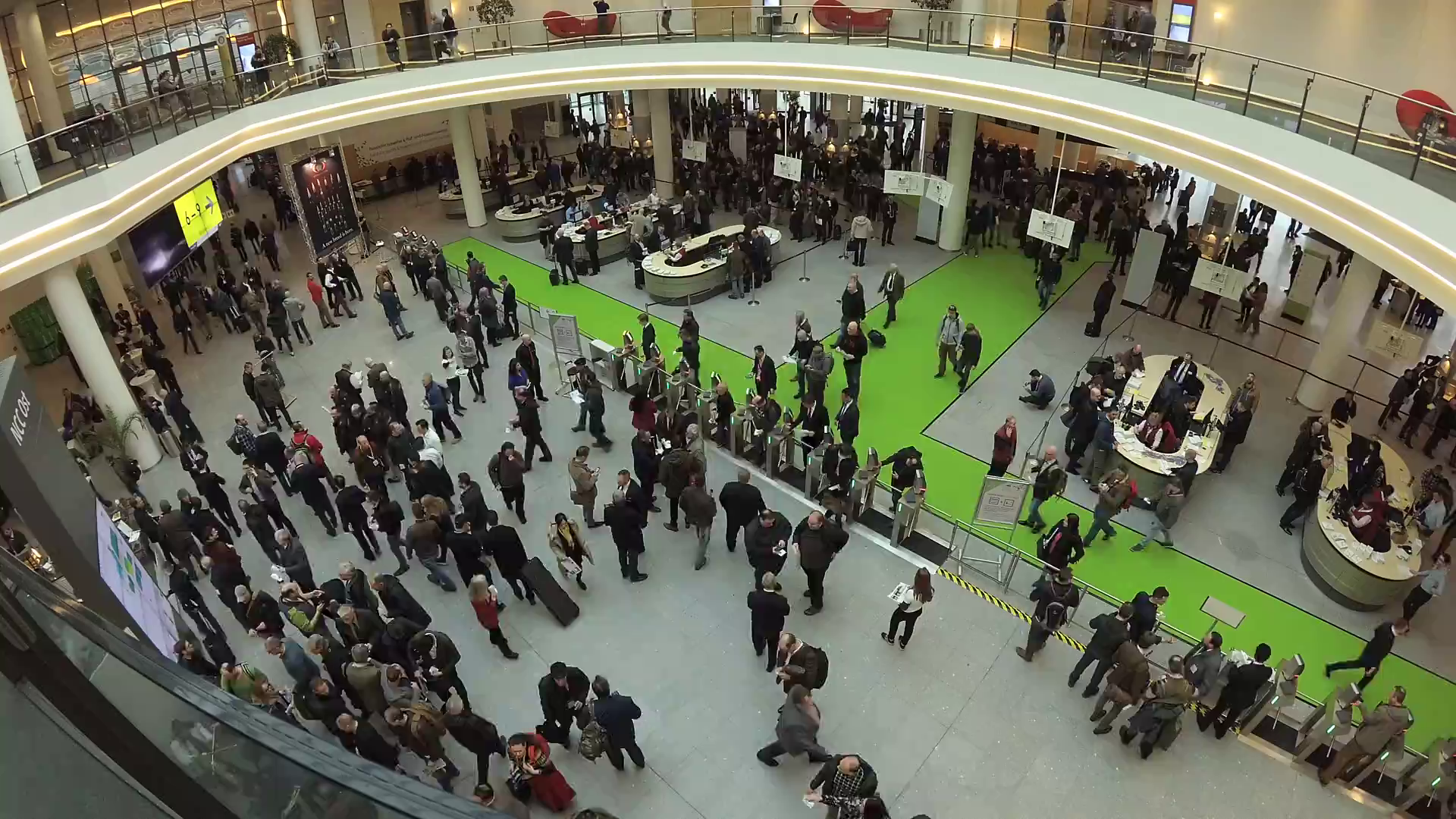
Entrance area of the IWA OutdoorClassics 2018

IWA OutdoorClassics, also referred to as simply IWA, short for Internationale Waffen Ausstellung (International Weapons Exhibition), is an annual trade fair held in the Messezentrum Nuremberg in Bavaria, Germany for the hunting, shooting sports, outdoor activity products, private security and law enforcement equipment industries.

IWA OutdoorClassics has been one of the world's leading exhibitions for the firearm, airgun and weapon accessory sector for 40 years. Approximately 1561 exhibitors with an international share of 80% presented their products and services in 2018 to more than 46,500 trade visitors from 121 countries. The international share of visitors is about 62%, which makes IWA & OutdoorClassics an important multinational occasion for the industry.

== See also ==
- SHOT Show
