= Puente (surname) =

Origin
- Meaning: "bridge"
- Region of origin: Spanish

Puente is a common surname in the Spanish language meaning "bridge". It is uncommon as a given name. People with the surname include:

- Anahí Puente (born 1983), Mexican actress and singer
- Audrey Puente (born 1970), American meteorologist
- Brian de la Puente (born 1985), American NFL football player
- David Puente, television journalist
- Dorothea Puente (1929–2011), American serial killer
- Isaac Puente (1896–1936), Basque physician
- Jill Puente, American marketing executive and venture capitalist
- Luis de la Puente (1554–1624), Spanish Jesuit and spiritual author
- Martina de la Puente (born 1975), Spanish shot putter
- Miguel Puente (born 1948), Mexican baseball player
- Rafael Puente, Mexican footballer
- Tito Puente (1923–2000), Puerto Rican musician
