= Adil Kaya =

Business executive

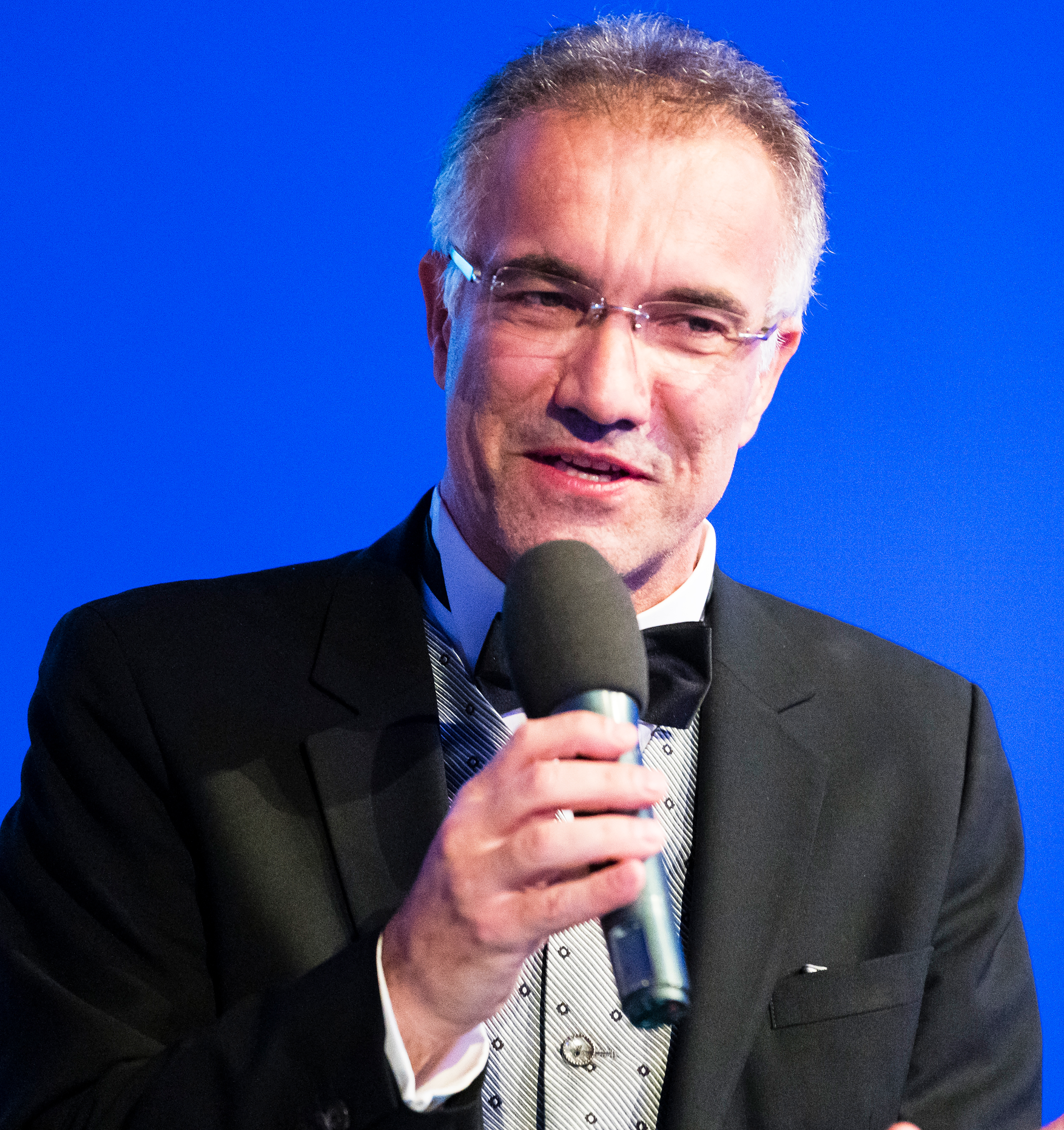
Adil Kaya (2020)

Adil Kaya (born July 20, 1967) is a business executive. He is best known for co-founding of the Film Festival Turkey Germany. Kaya holds the position of CEO of SIGOS, president of the film festival Turkey Germany in Nuremberg and chairman of the association InterForum - Kunst & Kultur Nürnberg International e.V.

== Biography ==
After studying electrical engineering in Cologne, Kaya has been with SIGOS in Nuremberg since March 1990. He has headed SIGOS Holding as managing director since 2008. The company offers test systems for all telecommunications network operators, government agencies and enterprises.

In 1992, he founded the Turkey Germany Film Festival in Nuremberg with friends and has been President of the festival since its foundation. On March 20, 2020, the film festival will open for the 25th time, visited by the “who is who list” of German and Turkish Cinema.

Kaya is also a film producer and distributor for arthouse films. He has co-produced the arthouse film, Tales of Intransigence“ (2004) (Original: "İnat Hikayeleri“) with Tunçel Kurtiz in the leading role, directed by Reis Çelik.

In 2010 Kaya was awarded the Citizen’s Medal of the City of Nuremberg, which is awarded to Nuremberg citizens since 1960 who have rendered special services to the City of Nuremberg.
