= Vuly Play =

Sports equipment manufacturer

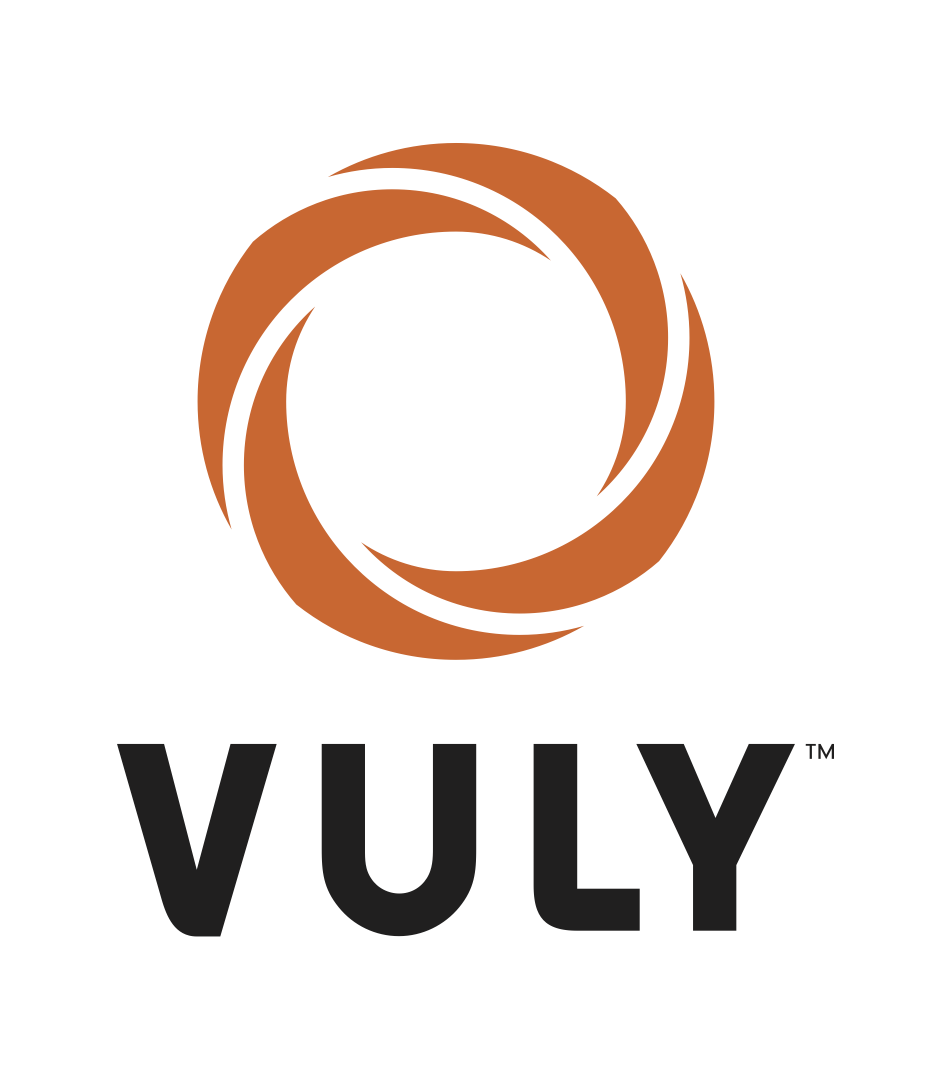
- Formerly: Vuly Trampolines
- Type: Private
- Industry: Outdoor Play Equipment
- Founded: 2007
- Founder: Joe Andon
- Headquarters: Wakerley, Queensland, Brisbane, Australia
- Areas served: Australia; North America; Europe
- Key people: Joe Andon (CEO)
- Products: Recreational trampolines; Trampoline parks; Trampoline accessories; Swing sets; Basketball hoop systems
- Website: www.vulyplay.com

Vuly Play (previously known as Trampolines Australia and Vuly Trampolines) is an Australian company that designs recreational trampoline products and other outdoor play equipment. It was founded in 2007 and has its headquarters in Brisbane, Australia. The company makes a springless Thunder trampoline, which uses elliptic leaf springs positioned around its base, to provide the trampoline's rebound.

== History ==
Vuly Play was founded by Joe Andon in 2007, as Trampolines Australia. The company initially launched from Andon's own room, with the help of a personal loan from his parents and his personal savings. Andon, a Palestinian who emigrated from Jerusalem to Australia with his parents when he was three years old, began running a marketing firm at the age of 16 before establishing Trampolines Australia.

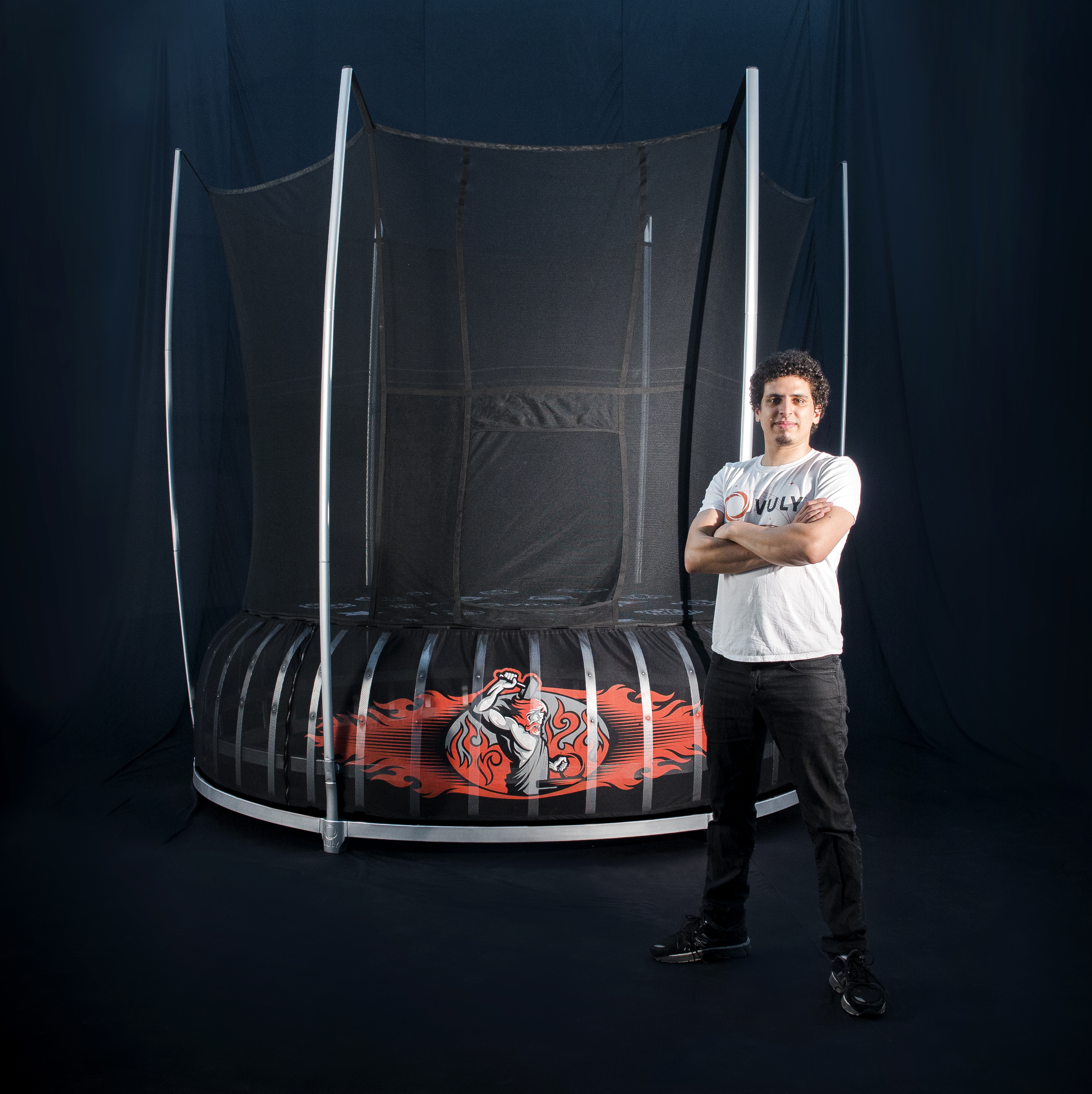
Vuly Trampolines founder Joe Andon standing next to the Vuly Thunder

With its products delivered locally in Queensland, the company established its headquarters in Wakerley in 2009, with Andon stating that the move was made to appear more plausible to his clients. In 2010, Trampolines Australia changed its name to Vuly Trampolines, after Vulcan the Roman God of smithery and fire, to enhance its export efforts to the United States. As they expanded their product range outside of trampolines, Vuly Trampolines re-branded to Vuly Play, encompassing their current and future outdoor play equipment.

Expansion throughout Australia began in 2011, which involved forming a number of wholesale partnerships, before the company launched into overseas territories the following year. Vuly released the Thunder trampoline in all markets during 2013, which secured them a US distribution contract with retailer, Toys 'R' Us. Competitor Springfree Trampolines filed a complaint in 2013 with the United States International Trade Commission, for alleged patent infringement upon its soft-edge trampolines. The case came to a conclusion in 2015, when an administrative law judge dropped the case, with a finding of no patent violation.

In the 2014 BRW/GE Capital Mid-Market Awards Vuly received the award for Best Mid-Market Innovator, while in November 2015, Australian Prime Minister Malcolm Turnbull visited the company's offices and laboratories, just two months after he replaced Tony Abbott. In the same year, Vuly also sealed a licensing agreement with Spin Master Ltd. Through the agreement, Spin Master acquired the rights to manufacture, distribute, advertise, promote and sell Vuly products in the United States, Canada, Mexico, and Europe; the initial presentation of the products in the European market would take place in the Nuremberg International Toy Fair.

== Products ==
The company designed its first trampoline in 2008, and it has since manufactured them in its factory in China. Their original trampoline underwent a series of updates and was renamed the "Classic". Thunder, the company's second model, is a trampoline that uses leaf springs instead of coil springs. It is sold with a tent kit, and it uses no bolts in its assembly. In 2014, Thunder won a Good Design Award in the Sport and Lifestyle category at the International Good Design Awards.

Vuly Trampolines launched Vuly2 in 2015, a redesign of the original Vuly trampoline, which incorporated Thunder's design in the net, net poles, and jump mat. The Vuly Lite model was next and incorporated elements from Thunder and Vuly2. In 2016, Vuly updated their current Thunder model and introduced Thunder Pro as their top-of-the-line trampoline product, while a new trampoline Ultra, became their most accessible in 2018.

Alongside trampoline products, Vuly now expands into a full range of outdoor play equipment. This includes basketball hoop systems and swing sets in the form of 360 Pro, a modular playset that can be customised with a range of different accessories. The 360 Pro Swing Set also won a Good Design Award in the Sport and Lifestyle category in 2017.

In 2021 Vuly expanded their outdoor play equipment range outside of backyards to include kids bikes. Their new range of bikes included balance bikes, kids mountain bikes and BMX bikes.

Vuly sponsors a number of well-known trampolinists including Olympians Blake Gaudry, Kat Driscoll and Ji Wallace, who act as ambassadors for Vuly Play's, participating in promotional events and publicised media appearances.

Vuly often donates their products to special needs communities such as AEIOU Foundation for Children with Autism.
