= Jaalam =

Jaalam may refer to:

- Jaalam Research, a Canadian network software company renamed AppNeta
- Jaalam (name), a biblical Hebrew male given name
