= Messe station =

Metro station in Nuremberg, Germany

Messe
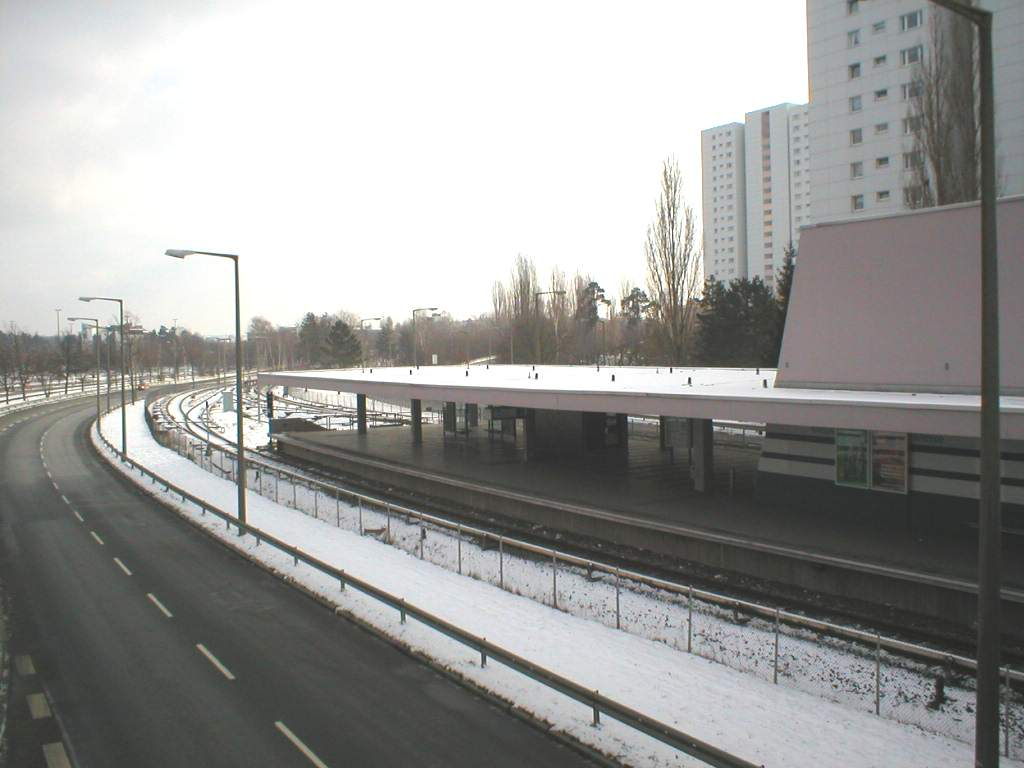

General information
- Location: Otto-Bärnreuther-Str; 90471 Nürnberg, Germany
- Coordinates: 49.416094°N 11.1143664°E
- System: Nuremberg U-Bahn station
- Operator: Verkehrs-Aktiengesellschaft Nürnberg

Construction
- Structure type: At grade

Other information
- Fare zone: VGN: 200

History
- Opened: 1 March 1972

Services
| Preceding station | Nuremberg U-Bahn | Following station |
|---|---|---|
| Bauernfeindstraße towards Fürth Hardhöhe | U1 | Langwasser Nord towards Langwasser Süd |
Location

Messe station is a Nuremberg U-Bahn station, located on the U1 line in Nuremberg, Germany. It serves the Messezentrum Nuremberg which holds important trade fairs including the Nuremberg International Toy Fair.

The station was featured in the 2011 Joe Wright film "Hanna". The title characters father, played by Eric Bana, is seen leaving the nearby bus station, entering the U-Bahn and then fighting several CIA agents.
