= Flyway (software) =

Database migration tool

- Developer: Redgate
- Stable release: 13.13.0 / November 19, 2026
- Written in: Java
- Operating system: Cross-platform
- Type: Schema migration (database)
- License: Apache License 2.0
- Website: flywaydb.org
- Repository: github.com/flyway/flyway

Flyway is an open-source database-migration tool.

== Concept ==
Flyway is based around seven basic commands: Migrate, Clean, Info, Validate, Undo, Baseline, and Repair.

Migrations can be written in SQL (database-specific syntax such as PL/SQL, T-SQL, etc is supported) or Java (for advanced data transformations or dealing with LOBs).

It has a command-line client, a Java API (also works on Android) for migrating the database on application startup, a Maven plugin, and a Gradle plugin.

Plugins are available for Spring Boot, Dropwizard, Grails, Play, SBT, Ant, Griffon, Grunt, Ninja, and more.

Supported databases include Oracle, SQL Server, DB2, MySQL (including Amazon RDS, Aurora MySQL, MariaDB), Percona XtraDB, PostgreSQL (including Amazon RDS and Heroku), Aurora PostgreSQL, YugabyteDB, CockroachDB, Redshift, Informix, H2, Hsql, Derby, SQLite, SAP HANA, Sybase ASE, Phoenix, Firebird and TiDB.

== Adoption ==
Flyway received 11,500,000 downloads in 2018.

In January 2015, Flyway was placed in the "Adopt" section of the Thoughtworks Technology Radar.

In July 2019, Flyway was acquired by Redgate.

== Related tools ==
- DBmaestro
- Liquibase
