= Langwasser Nord station =

Metro station in Nuremberg, Germany

Langwasser Nord
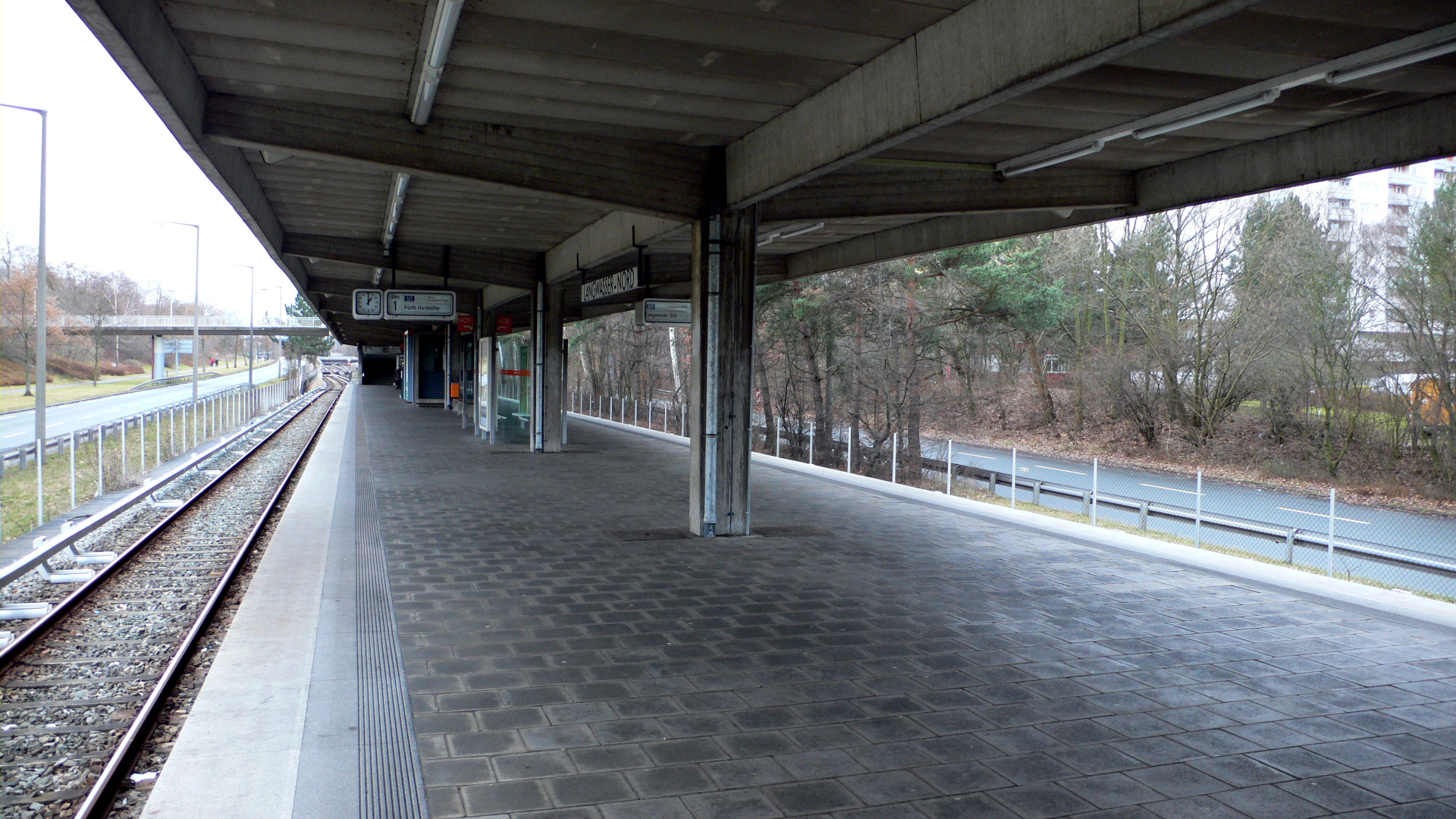

General information
- Location: Otto-Bärnreuther-Str. 90471 Nürnberg, Germany
- Coordinates: 49.4125209°N 11.1214019°E
- System: Nuremberg U-Bahn station
- Operator: Verkehrs-Aktiengesellschaft Nürnberg

Construction
- Structure type: At grade

Other information
- Fare zone: VGN: 200

History
- Opened: 1 March 1972

Services
Preceding station	Nuremberg U-Bahn	Following station
Messe towards Fürth Hardhöhe	U1	Scharfreiterring towards Langwasser Süd
Location

Langwasser Nord station is a Nuremberg U-Bahn station, located on the U1 line.
