= Frankenhalle =

Coordinates: 49°25′03″N 11°06′48″E

Frankenhalle is a multi-purpose indoor arena located on the site of the Messezentrum Nuremberg in Nuremberg, Germany. The arena opened in 1984 and has a capacity of 5,000 people. It hosts concerts, exhibitions, fairs and other events.
