= Jyoti Bansal =

Indian-born technology entrepreneur (born 1977)

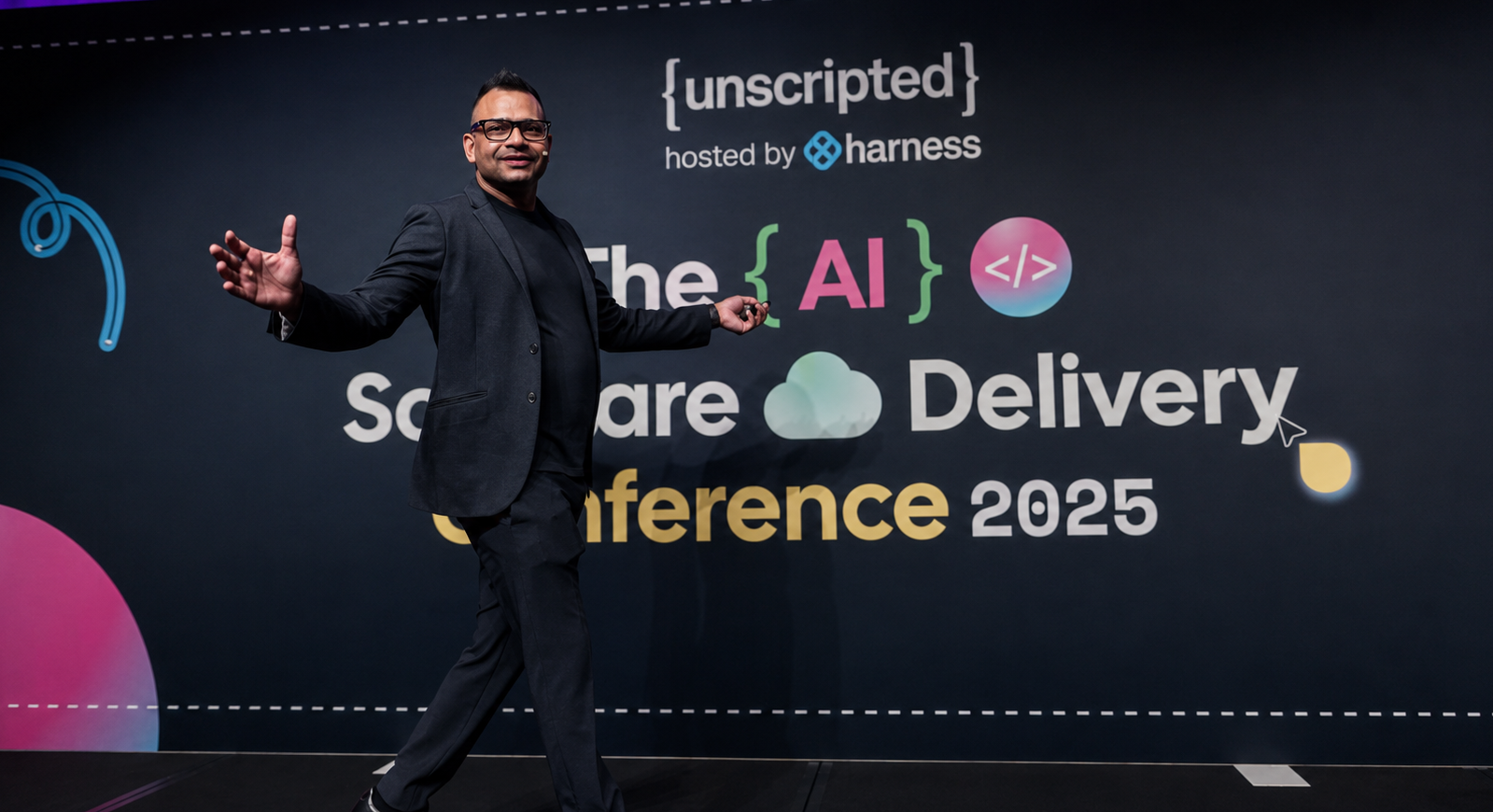
- Bansal speaking at the Harness Unscripted Summit
- Born: May 6, 1977 (age 49); Rajasthan, India
- Education: Indian Institute of Technology Delhi
- Occupations: Entrepreneur; Business executive
- Known for: AppDynamics; Harness; Traceable; Unusual Ventures

Jyoti Bansal (born April 4, 1978) is an Indian-American billionaire technology entrepreneur. He founded his first company AppDynamics in April 2008, and was CEO until 2015. AppDynamics was acquired by Cisco Systems for $3.7 billion, a day before AppDynamics was due for an initial public offering. He later founded additional technology companies, including Traceable, and is the co-founder and CEO of Harness. He also co-founded the venture capital firm Unusual Ventures and the start-up studio BIG Labs.

As of 2026, Bansal has a net worth of US$ 2.3 billion.

== Early life and education ==
Bansal was born in India. He grew up in a small city in the state of Rajasthan, where he helped his father run a small farm equipment retail business. Bansal attended the Indian Institute of Technology–Delhi, where he studied computer science from 1995 to 1999. In 2000, Bansal moved to the United States to work in the technology industry in Silicon Valley.

== Career ==
Bansal worked for a number of Silicon Valley start-ups from 2000 to 2007. The restrictions of his work visa prevented him from creating his own start-up company in the US before receiving a green card.

=== AppDynamics ===
In April 2008, Bansal founded his first start-up, AppDynamics, an application performance management company. The company provides tools for monitoring, diagnosing and troubleshooting performance slowdowns and other glitches in software code. Bansal led the company as CEO for the first eight years, from its founding to September 2015, by which time AppDynamics had grown to over 900 employees.

In September 2015, Bansal became the Chairman and Chief Strategist, handing over day-to-day operations of the company to a new CEO. He went on to be the company's Chairman during its sale to Cisco Systems.

In June 2016, Bansal was awarded Ernst & Young Entrepreneur of the Year Award for Northern California.

In December 2016, AppDynamics submitted a prospectus to the Securities and Exchange Commission on the initial public offering (IPO) of its stock. The company was due to open for public trade in January 2017 when a deal was reached, just days before, for the sale of the company to Cisco Systems. The final offered price of the sale totaled $3.7 billion.

=== BIG Labs ===
In October 2017, Bansal launched BIG (Bansal Innovation Group) Labs, a start-up studio, as his start-up testing ground to test out ideas and technology problems. In the same year, he launched Harness, the first start-up out of BIG Labs. In July 2020, Bansal launched Traceable, a second start-up from BIG Labs. Bansal is CEO of both Harness and Traceable.

=== Harness and Traceable ===
In October 2017, Bansal co-founded Harness, a platform for software developers to automate and simplify software delivery processes, where he is CEO. The company was developed as part of BIG Labs, a start-up studio founded by Bansal.

In July 2020, Bansal co-founded Traceable, a cybersecurity company focused on application security, where he is CEO. The company focuses on securing application programming interfaces (APIs) and protecting software applications from cyber threats.

In February 2025, Harness merged with Traceable and integrated its technology into its platform.

=== Unusual Ventures ===
In May 2018, Bansal announced that he and venture capitalist John Vrionis were launching a new seed fund, called Unusual Ventures with over $500 million of capital under management.

Bansal intends to focus on mentoring early stage start-ups, partnering with nonprofits and offering frequent masterclasses for budding entrepreneurs.

== Sources ==
- AppDynamics (2016-12-28). "Registration Statement on Form S-1". Securities and Exchange Commission.
- Bhattacharya, Ananya (2017-02-05). "Trump's crackdown on H-1B visas could prevent the next US unicorn born of Indian immigrants". Quartz.
- Bort, Julie (2015-02-17). "What it feels like to grow your first startup to a $1 billion valuation in under 7 years: 'Scary'". Business Insider.
- Cellan-Jones, Rory (2015-09-25). "Silicon Valley - still the capital of tech". BBC News.
- Darrow, Barb (2017-03-22). "Cisco and AppDynamics Close Their Blockbuster Deal". Fortune.
- Demery, Paul (2010-02-26). "Travel site Priceline finds a way to monitor its wide world of applications". Digital Commerce 360.
- "EY Announces Winners for the EY Entrepreneur Of The Year® 2016 Northern California Region Award". Ernst & Young. 2016-06-27. Archived from the original on 2017-06-18.
- Levy, Ari (2015-08-20). "How this developer's code saved 'Game of Thrones'". CNBC.
- Levy, Ari; Lipton, Josh (2017-01-24). "Cisco buys tech IPO candidate AppDynamics for $3.7 billion". CNBC.
- Ovide, Shira (2015-09-29). "AppDynamics Names David Wadhwani CEO". Wall Street Journal.
- Pillai, Shalina (2017-01-25). "This Bansal has just got over $500m from Cisco". The Times of India.
- Shankar, Shashwati (2017-01-27). "Indian techie Jyoti Bansal sells his company to Cisco for $3.7 billion". The Economic Times.
- Miller, Ron (2017-10-24). "AppDynamics founder Jyoti Bansal wastes little time launching a new company". Techcrunch.
- "AppDynamics founder launches Unusual Ventures, a new $160M seed-stage fund – TechCrunch". techcrunch.com. 15 May 2018.
- "Serial Founder Launches Cybersecurity Startup to Protect APIs Against Hackers". bizjournals.com.
- "Jyoti Bansal's Third Startup Goes After Code Security – TechCrunch". techcrunch.com. 14 July 2020.
