= Unusual Ventures =

American venture capital firm

- Type: Private
- Industry: Financial
- Founded: 2018
- Founder: John Vrionis and Jyoti Bansal
- Headquarters: Menlo Park, California
- Services: venture capital

Unusual Ventures is a seed-stage venture capital firm based in Menlo Park, California, founded in 2018 by John Vrionis and Jyoti Bansal. The firm focuses on early-stage investments in enterprise software startups, particularly those leveraging artificial intelligence.

== History ==
John Vrionis, formerly a partner at Lightspeed Venture Partners, and Jyoti Bansal, a serial entrepreneur known for founding AppDynamics and co-founding Harness and Traceable AI, co-founded Unusual Ventures in 2018.

The company's debut fund was centered on seed stage investments primarily in enterprise software and infrastructure. In the same year, Unusual Ventures launched Unusual Academy, a startup education and accelerator program.

Unusual Ventures raised its second fund, which came from nonprofit organizations, research organizations, and academic institutions, in 2019.

In May 2022, Unusual Ventures closed its third fund with $485 million in capital commitments. In the same year, the company announced that it was opening an office in Boston. Unusual Ventures also added Lars Albright as a General Partner in 2022.

In 2025, Jill Puente was appointed as the company's chief marketing officer.

Unusual Ventures has invested in companies such as Arctic Wolf Networks, Traceable AI, Harness, Strella, and Alto.
