= Jill Puente =

American marketing executive and venture capitalist

- Education: University of Georgia (BA International Affairs; MPA Public Administration)
- Occupations: Marketing executive; Venture capitalist
- Years active: 2012–present
- Employer: Unusual Ventures (Chief Marketing Officer)
- Known for: Building marketing & brand strategy at Google; Founding Marketing Partner at Pear VC; CMO at Unusual Ventures

Jillian “Jill” Puente is an American marketing executive and venture capitalist currently serving as Chief Marketing Officer (CMO) at Unusual Ventures. She previously served as Marketing Partner of Pear VC.

== Education ==
Puente graduated from the University of Georgia with a bachelor’s degree in international affairs in 2011 and also received a Master’s Degree in Public Administration from UGA in 2012.

== Career ==
Puente’s first job was as a legislative staffer for the U.S. Senate.

In 2013, Puente moved to Silicon Valley and began working for the social media marketing startup Wildfire. After Wildfire was acquired by Google, Puente served as the head of environment and sustainability marketing at Google. At Google, she oversaw initiatives such as Your Plan, Your Planet, an interactive environmental footprint measurement tool developed in collaboration with the California Academy of Sciences.

In 2015, Puente was named one of the University of Georgia Alumni Association’s 40 Under 40.

In 2022,Puente went on to serve as Marketing Partner of Pear VC, where she handled marketing, communications, and community engagement.

In April 2025, Puente was appointed CMO of Unusual Ventures.

== Personal life ==
Jill Puente is married to Lucas Puente, a senior survey scientist at Slack. They have a son.
