= Spielwarenmesse eG =

Spielwarenmesse eG is a trade fair organizer and marketing services provider for the toy industry. It also organize the Spielwarenmesse International Toy Fair Nürnberg, the world's biggest trade fair for professionals from the toy and consumer goods industries.

== The story of Spielwarenmesse eG ==
Spielwarenmesse eG brings together toy professionals from all over the world and gives them valuable inspiration for successful business. It was founded under the name of “Deutsche Spielwaren-Fachmesse eGmbH” by 46 toy companies on 11 July 1950. It was renamed “Spielwarenmesse eGmbH” in 1958 and ultimately “Spielwarenmesse eingetragene Genossenschaft” in 1973. The cooperative's organs are the executive board, the supervisory board and the General Assembly. Every year at the beginning of February, the fair brings together 2,700 exhibitors and some 80,000 trade visitors in Nuremberg.

== Global Toy Conference ==
The extensive knowledge offered by Spielwarenmesse eG culminates every year in the Global Toy Conference, which takes place with top international speakers parallel to the Spielwarenmesse International Toy Fair Nürnberg.

== Representatives – contacts all over the world ==
The global network of representatives supports Spielwarenmesse eG in over 90 countries. In addition, the 100-percent subsidiary Spielwarenmesse Shanghai Co., Ltd., founded in 2010, looks after inquiries from China.

== Company holdings ==
Together with the Russian National Toy Association RNTA, Spielwarenmesse eG holds a stake in the Russian exhibition organization company RNTA Expo, which organizes the Russian industry's leading fair Toys & Kids Russia in Moscow.

== Literature ==
- Spielwarenmesse Nürnberg eG (Hrsg.): 50 Jahre Spielwarenmesse Nürnberg. Geschichte eines Erfolges. Fränkischer Tag, Bamberg 1998, S. 12
