= Joe Andon =

Australian businessperson

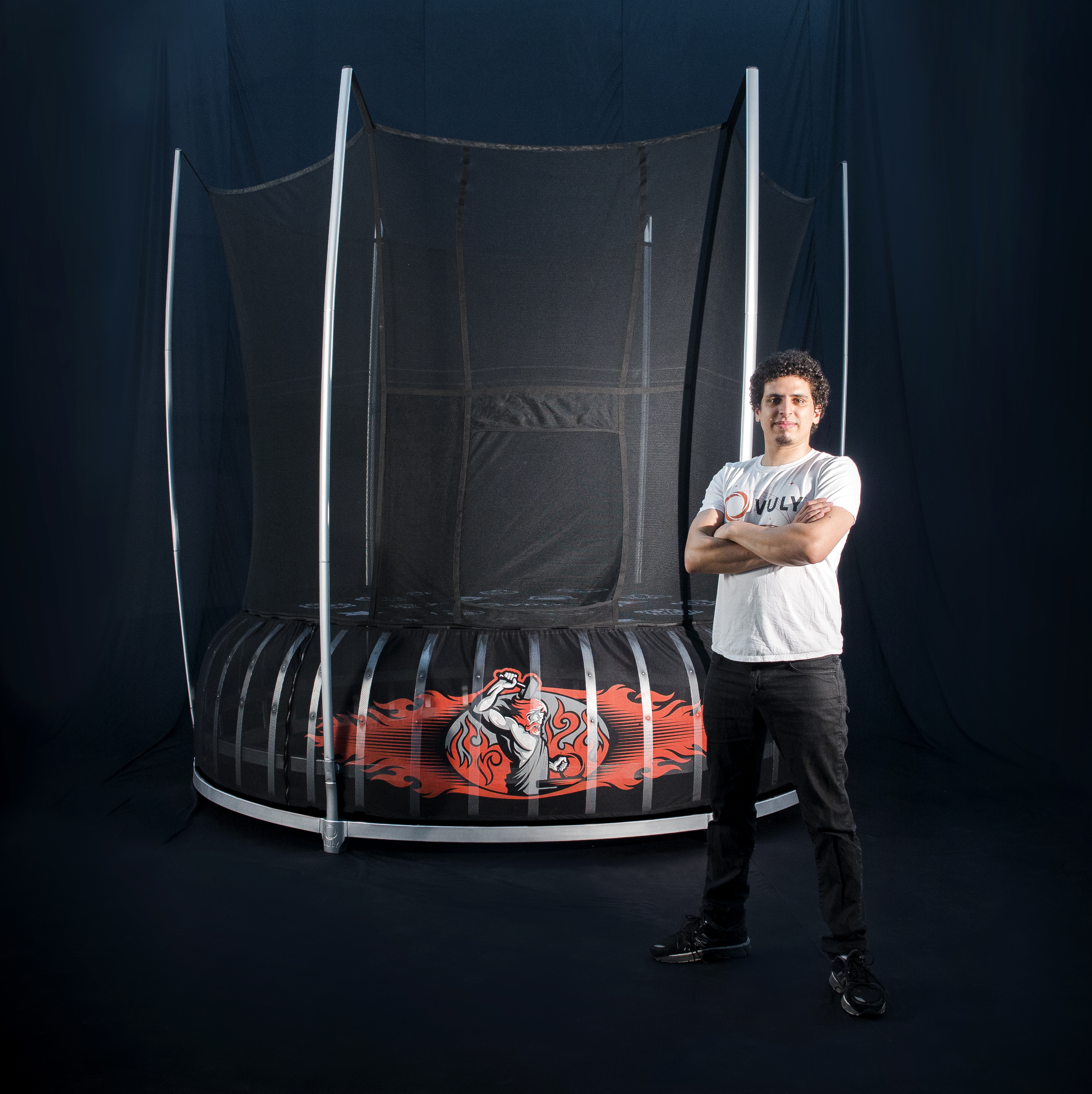
- Occupation: Businessman
- Known for: Vuly Play (Founder & CEO)
- Website: Joe Andon on LinkedIn

Joe Andon is an Australian businessperson and the founder and CEO of Vuly Play.

== Early life and education ==
Andon is Palestinian born and moved from Jerusalem to Brisbane Australia when he was three years old. He ran his own marketing firm at the age of 15 while also selling books at the markets in Manly.

== Career ==
Andon founded Vuly Trampolines at the age of 18. Using money he made from his marketing venture along with a loan from his father, he began the company out of his bedroom. He got the initial idea after running his finger down a list of products before it settled on trampolines. He purchased a container load of the product and set up a website to sell them. Andon began redesigning trampolines with fewer parts and more safety features, eventually manufacturing the ones he sold. Andon expanded Vuly Trampolines internationally with products being sold in Australia, the United States, Canada, Mexico, and Europe.

Andon was nominated for Entrepreneur of the Year in Australia in 2014 and was named to The Courier-Mail's Top 20 under 40 list in 2016. In 2016 he was named Brisbane Person of the Year by the Lord Mayor of Brisbane.
