= Continuous design =

Design process

Evolutionary design, continuous design, evolutive design, incremental design or evolutionary architecture is directly related to any modular design application, in which components can be freely substituted to improve the design, modify performance, or change another feature at a later time.

Software architects and software developers should use "fitness functions" to continuously keep the software system in check. According to Neal Ford, evolutionary architecture delays decisions until the "last responsible moment." That moment can be identified with fast feedback loops and guiding fitness functions.

According to Neal Ford, evolutionary architecture adopts "Bring the pain forward," tackling tough tasks early, fostering automation and swift issue detection.

== Informatics ==
In particular, it applies (with the name continuous design) to software development. In this field it is a practice of creating and modifying the design of a system as it is developed, rather than purporting to specify the system completely before development starts (as in the waterfall model). Continuous design was popularized by extreme programming. Continuous design also uses test driven development and refactoring. Martin Fowler wrote a popular book called Refactoring, as well as a popular article entitled "Is Design Dead?", that talked about continuous/evolutionary design. James Shore wrote an article in IEEE titled "Continuous Design".

== Industrial design Project ==
Modular design states that a product is made of subsystems that are joined together to create a full product. The above design model defined in electronics and evolved in industrial design into well consolidated industrial standards related to platform concept and its evolution.

== See also ==
- Rapid application development
- Continuous integration
- Evolutionary database design
