= ExtraHop Networks =

Cybersecurity company based in Seattle

ExtraHop Networks, Inc.
- Type: Private
- Industry: Cybersecurity
- Founded: 2007
- Founders: Jesse Rothstein; Raja Mukerji
- Headquarters: Seattle, WA
- Key people: Greg Clark, CEO
- Products: RevealX; RevealX 360
- Owners: Bain Capital Private Equity, Crosspoint Capital Partners
- Number of employees: 501 to 1,000
- Website: www.extrahop.com

ExtraHop is a Seattle-based cybersecurity company providing AI-based network intelligence.

== History ==
Jesse Rothstein and Raja Mukerji founded ExtraHop in 2007 in Seattle, Washington.

In April 2009, ExtraHop acquired $5.1 million in funding from the Madrona Venture Group and other private investors including Marc Andreessen and Ben Horowitz. In May 2014, the company closed a $41 million Series C round led by Technology Crossover Ventures (TCV). Other participants in this round included existing investors Meritech Capital Partners and Madrona Venture Group, as well as private investors including Sujal Patel, former CEO and founder of Isilon Systems. This round brought ExtraHop’s total venture funding to $61.6 million.

In 2018, ExtraHop released the Reveal(x) product, followed 2 years later by the launch of SaaS-based Reveal(x) 360. In January 2019, the company announced having booked $100 million in revenue for the previous year.

In July 2021, ExtraHop was acquired by Bain Capital Private Equity and Crosspoint Capital Partners for $900 million. In February 2022, the company announced that it had appointed Patrick Dennis as CEO. By October 2023, Dennis was moved to an advisory role with co-founder and managing partner at Crosspoint Greg Clark taking over as ExtraHop CEO. In January 2025, Rob Greer joined as Chief Executive Officer.

On January 9, 2024, ExtraHop announced an addition $100M investment from their existing investors.

On July 22, 2026, ExtraHop launched the Agentic SOC Alliance, uniting multiple companies around a shared model for LLM-based security operations.

ExtraHop operates globally with offices in Seattle, Washington (HQ); London, UK; Germany; France; Australia; Singapore; and Japan.

== Products ==
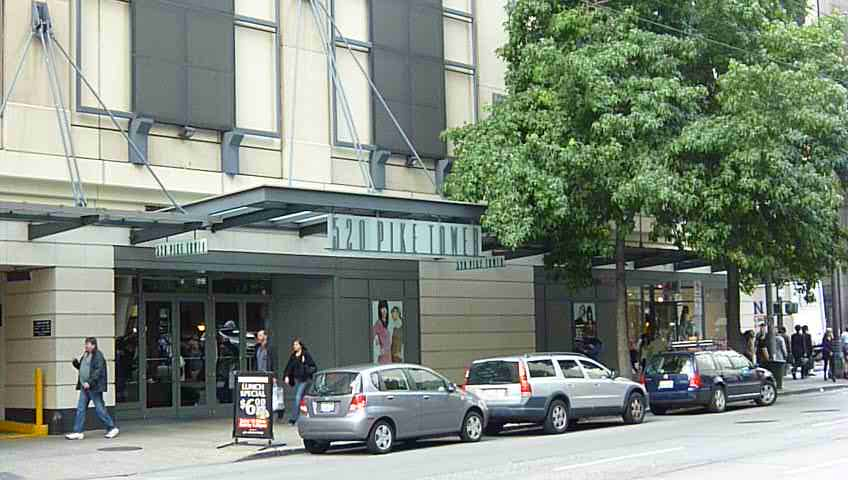
ExtraHop is headquartered on the 16th floor of 520 Pike Tower in downtown Seattle

ExtraHop launched the RevealX network intelligence product for Security Operations teams in 2018. In 2020, the company introduced RevealX 360, a fully SaaS-based version of their network detection and response platform.

== Integrations ==
ExtraHop RevealX natively integrates with a number of technology products, including endpoint security (CrowdStrike), threat intelligence, and Saas/IaaS/PaaS platforms such as Microsoft 365 and AWS native telemetry.

A sample list of known integrations includes: CrowdStrike; Microsoft Defender Security Center; Windows Defender ATP; Microsoft 365; AWS quarantine; Azure Sentinel; Cisco ISE; Palo Alto NGFW, Panorama, Demisto; Splunk SIEM & Phantom; Exabeam; IBM Qradar; ServiceNow; Netskope; Carbon Black; Fortinet, Gigamon, and Check Point.

== Certifications ==
ExtraHop holds a number of industry certifications. These include SOC 2 Type II, SOC 3, GDPR, HIPAA and US Privacy Shield.

== Customers ==
Known ExtraHop customers include Ulta Beauty, Home Depot, Wizards of the Coast, and the city of Dallas.
