= Keynote Systems =

US-based Internet company (1995–2015)

- Type: Private
- Traded as: Nasdaq: KEYN
- Industry: Computer software
- Founded: January 1, 1995; 31 years ago
- Founders: James Barrick and Andy Popell
- Fate: Merged with Dynatrace
- Headquarters: San Mateo, California
- Website: www.dynatrace.com

Keynote Systems was a U.S. based company that specialized in developing and marketing software as a service technology to measure, test, and improve from the end user perspective, the performance of websites, online content, applications, and services across browsers, networks, and mobile devices. Keynote provided independent testing, measurement and monitoring of mobile content, applications, and services on real devices across multiple mobile operator networks.

Keynote Systems merged with Dynatrace in 2015.

== History ==
Keynote Systems was founded in 1995. It launched "Keynote Perspective" in 1996 and launched Business 40 Internet Performance Index in 1997 and globalized internet-performance metrics securing $4.7 million in equity financing.

the company went public on NASDAQ on September 24, 1999. The company claimed corporate customers including American Express, BP, Caterpillar, Disney, eBay, E*TRADE, Expedia, Microsoft, Sony Ericsson, Sprint, T-Mobile, Verizon and Vodafone.

In 2001, Keynote added Google to Business 40 Internet Performance index.

In 2002, Keynote was named the 13th fastest growing North American tech company. In 2002, Keynote won InternetWeek's "Best of Breed" award.

In 2003, the company offered to buy back 7.5 million of its shares, or about 33 percent, for $71.3 million.

In 2005, Keynote and Zandan announce product-development and marketing partnership.

In 2007, Keynote joined Russell 3000 index. and launched Web Site Performance index for the 2008 Olympics. Keynote also introduced KITE (Keynote Internet Testing Environment) and launched MITE (Mobile Internet Testing Environment), a desktop based mobile testing. Keynote's Voice Perspective Service was named one of the top 25 innovations of 2007 by VoIP News.

In 2009, Keynote Systems introduced Mobile Application Perspective 3.0, a real time operational monitoring for text messaging.

The company acquired RedAlert in 2000, Envive and OnDevice in 2001, NetMechanics, Streamcheck, and Enviz in 2002, Xaffire's Insight Service Suite in 2003, Hudson-Williams NY and Vividence in 2004, Hudson-Williams Europe and GomezPro Business Unit in 2005, Keynote Sigos in 2006, Zandan in 2008, and DeviceAnywhere in 2011.

In August, 2013, private equity firm Thoma Bravo acquired Keynote Systems for about $395 million.

In June 2015, Keynote Systems merged with Dynatrace, the latter having John Van Siclen as acting CEO.
