= David Puente =

American television journalist

- Education: New York University
- Occupations: producer, journalist, writer, news anchor
- Years active: 1995–present
- Television: Creator and anchor of Exclusiva
- Height: 1.90 m (6 ft 3 in)

David Puente is a TV, print and producer. He is a journalist. He has joined Spain's Sabbah Media headed by veteran Spanish media exec Francoise Sabbah in 2013. Sabbah Media is an independent TV production company based in Spain.

He was a broadcast news executive and a producer at CNN's Anderson Cooper 360°. He was also an on-air contributor for CNN Español and edits the Latino section of InAmerica, a CNN blog about identities and perspectives of diverse communities in the United States. Before joining CNN in 2009, he was the creator, anchor and broadcast producer of ABC News Exclusiva.

In 2012, he was labeled one of "only two Hispanic Americans in key positions on TV."

Puente began his career as a freelance foreign reporter in the 1990s based in Madrid, Paris and London. He also worked throughout Africa and the Middle East covering several trips of President Clinton including his historic tour of African nations in 1998. He went on to become a producer at the newsmagazine 20/20.

He speaks Spanish, French and studies Arabic.

== Exclusiva ==
In November 2004, David Puente created Exclusiva, a television news program about Hispanic news in English for ABC News Now, the network's digital news channel that transmits on the Internet and wireless technology.

Exclusiva reported on a wide range of stories about Hispanics around the world.

== Online ==
David Puente was also responsible for writing the first Spanish-language articles ever published on ABCNews.com. He also began a weekly ABC News segment on Spanish-language radio, which also had never before existed in network news.

== Move to AC360 ==
On February 5, 2009, David Puente sent a message to his Exclusiva Facebook group announcing his move to CNN with Anderson Cooper 360° and ac360.com after four years as ABC News Exclusiva's anchor and producer.

== Move to Clarity Media Group ==
In 2014, David joined Clarity Media Group as a communications strategist and Latino Market Expansion Director. His clients have included NBC News, Facebook, L'Oreal and Univision.

== Awards ==
Year	Award	Organization	Work	Category
2001	Emmy Award	ATAS/NATAS	ABC 2000
2001	Emmy Award	ATAS/NATAS	ABC News	Coverage of 9/11
2003	National Headliner Award	Press Club of Atlantic City	Exclusiva	Work with Barbara Walters on her exclusive interview of Fidel Castro
2005	"Man of the Year" "Hombres Destacados (Outstanding Men) Award	El Diario La Prensa Newspaper
2005	Philanthropic award		Work with public school students in Newark
2006	Disney Cast Community Fund Grant		Philanthropic work
2010	Time Warner Heiskell Award for Community Service		Philanthropic work
2011	Emmy Award	ATAS/NATAS	Anderson Cooper 360°: "Haiti in Ruins"	Outstanding Coverage of a Breaking News Story in a Regularly Scheduled Newscast
2011	Emmy Award	ATAS/NATAS	Anderson Cooper 360°: "Crisis in Haiti"	Outstanding Live Coverage of a Current News Story – Long Form

== Leo Puente Memorial Fund ==
In 2000, David established the Leo Puente Memorial Fund in memory of his brother Julio "Leo" Puente, a vice principal and baseball coach in the Newark Public School District. In partnership with the 501(c)(3) nonprofit Community Foundation of New Jersey, the fund has awarded over $150,000 in college scholarships and other programs to Newark public school students.
