= DBmaestro =

- Industry: DevOps, Database, DataOps
- Founded: 2012
- Founder: Yaniv Yehuda
- Headquarters: Orlando, Florida
- Area served: Worldwide
- Key people: Gil Nizri (CEO), Yaniv Yehuda (CPO, Founder)
- Products: DBmaestro Database DevOps Platform (Database Release Automation, Agentic Database DevOps, Database DevOps Observability, Database Source Control, Database Security & Compliance)
- Website: www.dbmaestro.com

DBmaestro is a computer software company with sales headquartered in Orlando. It markets its services for database DevOps collaboration between development and IT operations teams.

DBmaestro was founded in 2012 by Yaniv Yehuda. To date, the company raised venture capital funding of $7.5m.

Their flagship product is a database DevOps platform that enables organizations to automate various stages of the database development lifecycle. This platform integrates with a wide range of popular relational databases and cloud platforms, providing a unified approach to database management across diverse environments.

== Products ==
DBmaestro's Database DevOps Platform software focuses on database development and controls application specific data. DBmaestro integrates with other technologies such as Oracle Database, Microsoft SQL Server, IBM DB2, PostgreSQL, Snowflake, MySQL, MariaDB, Amazon RDS and Amazon Redshift.

DBmaestro software as a service offers database release automation capabilities designed to optimize DevOps environments for enterprises by automating continuous integration and continuous delivery (CI/CD) processes for databases with zero disruption to existing processes. DBmaestro's Database DevOps platform offers a visual database pipeline builder, which enables organizations to package, verify, deploy, and promote database changes, and a database release automation module, which revalidates the final state to make sure the database release process ended successfully, while auditing all changes made.

By 2019, DBmaestro provided support and integrations for Atlassian's Jira, Git, Chef, Puppet and Jenkins, among others. In 2022, DBmaestro released a database source control module with which users can manage all changes made to the database code, structure or content across different teams, maintaining a single source of truth inside Git for all changes to the database. Following this, DBmaestro then rolled out in 2023 an AI-powered database error-management assistant which can automatically identify errors in database releases and propose immediate feedback including best practices for resolution.

In April 2026, DBmaestro launched a Model Context Protocol (MCP) server, making it the first database DevOps platform purpose-built for agentic AI workflows. The MCP server enables AI agents to execute complex database operations across development, QA, and production environments using natural language prompts, while maintaining enterprise-grade role-based permissions, compliance tracking, and full audit trails.

DBmaestro's platform includes a Database DevOps Observability module, which provides real-time visibility into database deployments. The module is designed to enable faster troubleshooting, improved operational efficiency, and heightened compliance monitoring across database environments.

DBmaestro aligns its platform with the DORA (DevOps Research and Assessment) framework, supporting organizations in measuring and improving the four key software delivery metrics: deployment frequency, lead time for changes, change failure rate, and time to restore service. DBmaestro is endorsed by DORA lead and Google Cloud Developer Advocate Nathen Harvey, who credited the platform with empowering teams to "ship changes more frequently and reliably".

== Partnership with IBM ==
In July, 2019, DBmaestro announced a global reselling partnership agreement with IBM, in which IBM will be offering DBmaestro's platform to its worldwide enterprise customer base. In July, 2025, DBmaestro expanded this partnership with IBM by signing an OEM partnership agreement. As a result, DBmaestro now supports the full IBM DevOps suite, including IBM DevOps Loop, IBM DevOps Deploy and IBM DevOps Velocity. Future integrations are planned with IBM Z, HashiCorp Vault, Terraform & Waypoint, Instana and IBM ELM.

== Customers ==
DBmaestro serves large enterprises across multiple industries worldwide. Notable customers include Pilot Flying J, Ford, Elevance Health, CDW, Sogei, and the University of Lausanne. Pilot Flying J reported that DBmaestro reduced database pipeline execution from hours and days to minutes. One enterprise HR software provider scaled from one manual database release per three weeks to 2,300 releases per month following deployment of the platform.

== Recognition & Awards ==
In 2015, DBmaestro was recognized by the editors of SD Times, Computing magazine, and a market research company. In 2016 DBmaestro was lauded for “standing out from the crowd” in the 2016 DevOps Dozen Awards. The voting was conducted by the website DevOps.Com and consisted of thousands of people in the industry who cast their votes in 12 categories. In 2018, DBmaestro was honored as a Bronze Stevie Award Winner for New Product or Service of the Year - Software - DevOps Solution
