= AppDynamics =

APM Monitoring platform for cloud applications

AppDynamics, Inc.
- Type: Private company
- Industry: (APM) Application Performance Management System Monitoring
- Founded: 2008; 18 years ago
- Founder: Jyoti Bansal
- Defunct: 2025
- Fate: Merged into Splunk
- Successor: Splunk
- Headquarters: San Francisco, CA, United States
- Products: List: Application performance monitoring; Business performance monitoring; Network monitoring; End user monitoring; Infrastructure monitoring; DevOps monitoring; Observability
- Revenue: US$ 143.8 million (2015)
- Parent: Cisco
- Website: appdynamics.com

AppDynamics was an American observability, full-stack application performance management (APM) and IT operations analytics (ITOA) company based in San Francisco. In 2017, it was acquired for $3.7 billion by Cisco, and later (2025) merged into Splunk, which Cisco had acquired in 2024.

== History ==
AppDynamics was founded in 2008 by Jyoti Bansal, a former lead software architect at Wily Technologies, a provider of application performance management technology. AppDynamics received five rounds of funding totaling $206.5 Million.

On April 10, 2013, CA Technologies (formerly Computer Associates) filed a lawsuit in the US District Court for the Eastern District in New York. The lawsuit claims that AppDynamics violated three patents that came into CA Technologies' possession through acquisitions. This was the second action CA Technologies filed in connection with alleged infringement of patents obtained in the acquisition of Wily Technology. In November 2012, CA Technologies filed a lawsuit asserting patent infringement of the same three APM patents against software company, New Relic. On April 20, 2015, AppDynamics and CA settled the two-year-old patent dispute. AppDynamics said that it paid a "modest fixed payment."

In January 2017, Cisco acquired AppDynamics for $3.7 billion, just days before a planned IPO of the company. In March 2017, Cisco completed the acquisition of AppDynamics. In 2025, AppDynamics was merged into Splunk, which Cisco had acquired in 2024.
