= Messezentrum Nuremberg =

Convention center in Bavaria, Germany

Coordinates: 49°25′02″N 11°06′54″E

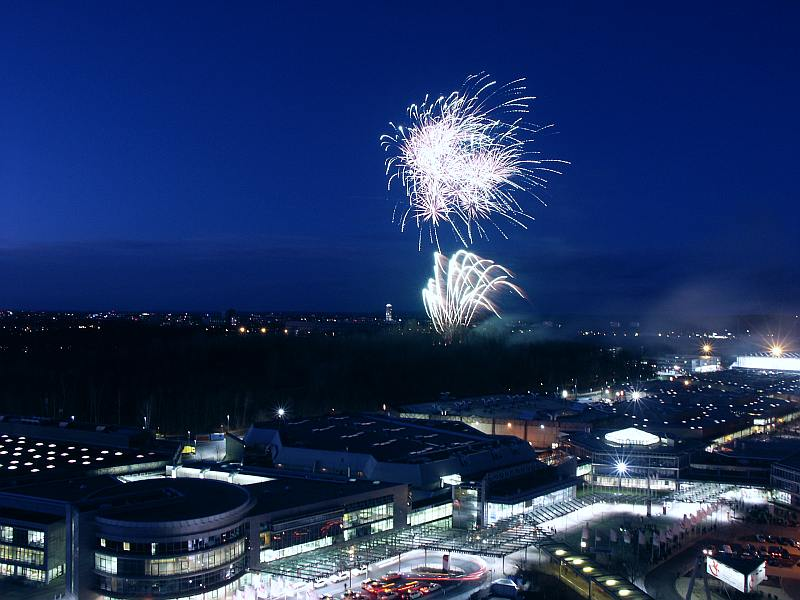
Messezentrum Nuremberg during the Nuremberg International Toy Fair

Messezentrum Nuremberg is a convention center located in Nuremberg, Germany, which opened in 1974. It is owned and operated by the NürnbergMesse company. The site features 170,000 m^{2} of display area that extends over 15 exhibition halls, including Frankenhalle. Notable artists that have performed at the center include Led Zeppelin, AC/DC, Black Sabbath, Rainbow and Genesis.

The center hosts different trade fairs, including the Nuremberg International Toy Fair, the annual Embedded World Conference and Exhibition, and SPS - Smart Production Solutions.

== Transportation ==
The fairgrounds can be reached by U1 of the Nuremberg U-Bahn via the Messe station. The station opened on March1st 1972, the opening day of the first stretch of the system.
