= AppNeta =

Computer software company

- Type: Private
- Industry: Cloud Based Network Performance Management and Web Application Performance Service
- Founded: Vancouver, British Columbia (2000)
- Headquarters: Boston, Massachusetts
- Key people: Matt Stevens; CEO
- Products: PathView, FlowView, AppView, TraceView
- Website: www.appneta.com

AppNeta is a computer software company headquartered in Boston, Massachusetts, with research and development based in Vancouver, British Columbia. currently a part of Broadcom Software.

== History ==
The company was co-founded in July 2000 by Irfhan Rajani as Jaalam Research and then later renamed to Jaalam Technologies. Its first product was called Appare.Net.

In December 2002, Glenn Wong became chief executive, and in August 2003 the company was renamed again to Apparent Networks, to reflect its product. In January 2004 Wong resigned and Rajani resumed his role as chief.

It is privately held, with venture capital investors, including SolarWinds, Bain Capital Ventures, JMI Equity, Egan-Managed Capital and Business Development Bank of Canada.

In 2008, its headquarters moved from Vancouver to Boston. Apparent Networks changed their name to AppNeta in 2011. Customers and partners include Artisan Infrastructure and Bandwidth Management Group.

In July 2014, Matt Stevens, co-founder of AppNeta, replaced Jim Melvin as the company's CEO. On December 7, 2021, AppNeta announced its acquisition by Broadcom.

== Technology ==
AppNeta provides software as a service cloud tools that are intended for enterprises, managed service providers and other technology vendors. Enterprises can use the software to manage application and network performance across different branch offices. This technology has also been deployed by managed service providers (MSPs) to monitor their customers' network performance and generate service revenue.

The company also provides services designed to monitor and analyze network traffic.

In September 2012, the company released a performance management tool called TraceView, after acquiring Tracelytics. According to AppNeta, this service provides Web application performance management across different application layers and environments.
