= Nuremberg International Toy Fair =

International trade fair for toys and games

Coordinates: 49°25′03″N 11°07′04″E

Nuremberg International Toy Fair/Spielwarenmesse
- Status: Active
- Genre: Toys, Games
- Venue: Messezentrum
- Location: Nuremberg
- Country: Germany
- Inaugurated: 12 - 18 March 1950
- Attendance: 73,000 (2017)
- Organizer: Spielwarenmesse eG
- Website: https://www.spielwarenmesse.de/?L=1

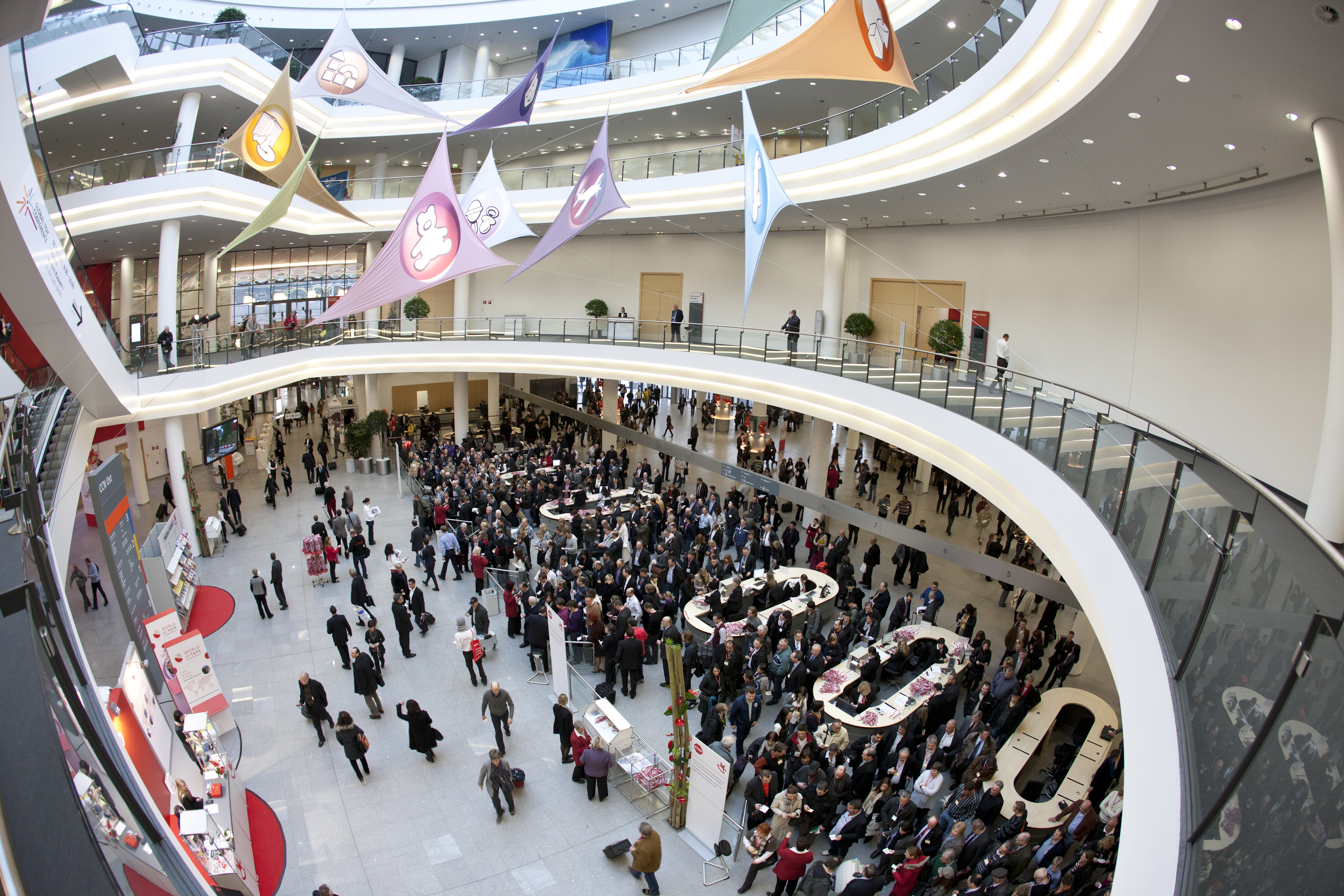
Fair ground 2011

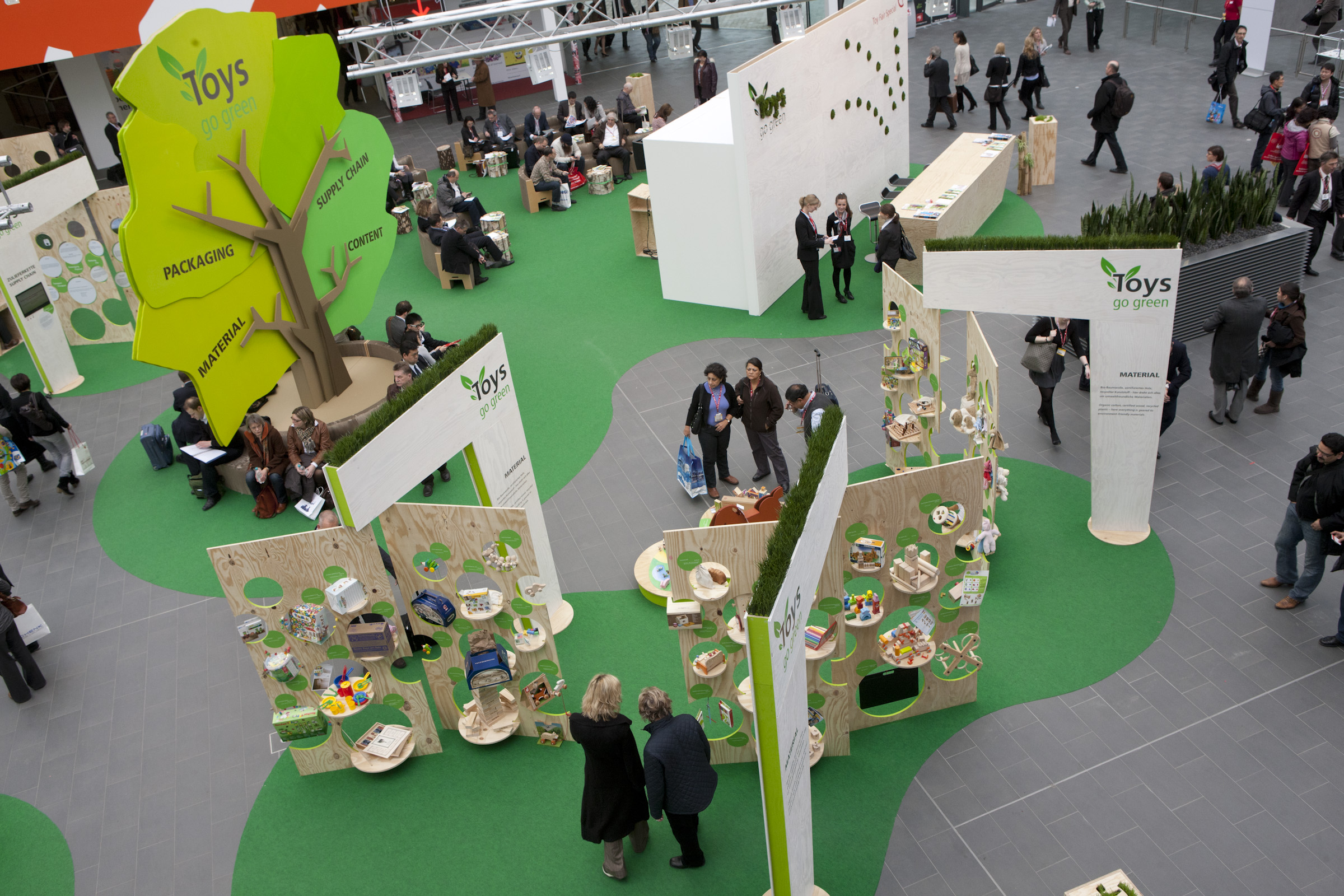
Toys go Green!

The Nuremberg International Toy Fair (German: Spielwarenmesse), held annually since 1950, is the largest international trade fair for toys and games. Only trade visitors associated with the toy business, journalists and invited guests are admitted. Each year during the course of the event which is held for six days, about 2,800 exhibitors from about 60 countries present their products. In 2017, 73,000 trade visitors and purchasers from 123 countries came for the fair. The fair is organized by Spielwarenmesse eG, a marketing and trade fair service provider, based in Nuremberg, Germany.

== Range of products ==
Every year, about one million products are displayed on the fair, including approximately 70,000 new products. On the fair, they are presented in twelve different product groups. These are, as of the 2011 fair:

- Model Construction, Hobbies
- Model Railways and Accessories
- Technical Toys, Educational toys, Action Toys
- Dolls, Soft Toys,
- Games, Books, Learning and Experimenting, Multimedia
- Festive and Trend Articles, Carnival
- Wooden Toys, Craftworks, Gifts
- Arts& Crafts, Creative Design
- Sports, Leisure, Outdoor
- School Articles, Stationery
- Baby & Infant Articles
- Multi-product Group

== ToyInnovation/ToyAward ==
The awarded products stand out due to their degree of innovation, product concept, creativity and playing idea. A jury of industry experts determines the winners in different categories:

- Baby&Infant
- PreSchool
- SchoolKids
- Teenager&Adults
- StartUp
- Sustainability

== Global Toy Conference ==
The Global Toy Conference takes place on the last day of the fair and deals with issues concerning the future of the toy trade and industry, e.g. sustainability, toy safety, online marketing and successful selling on the Internet.
