= Instana =

German-American software firm

- Type: Start-up
- Founded: April 2015; 11 years ago in Solingen, Germany
- Founders: Mirko Novakovic; Pete Abrams; Fabian Lange; Pavlo Baron
- Website: www.instana.com

Instana is a German-American software firm based in Solingen as well as Chicago and San Francisco. It specialises in developing application performance management (APM) software.

== Products ==
Instana's software is intended particularly for use in monitoring and managing the performance of software used in microservice architectures, and permits 3D visualisation of performance through graphs generated using machine learning algorithms, with notifications regarding performance also generated automatically. Instana's Application Performance Monitoring (APM) tool of the same name is especially purposed for monitoring software used in so-called "container orchestration" (a modular method of providing a software service).

== History ==
The firm was founded in April 2015 by Mirko Novakovic, Pete Abrams, Fabian Lange, and Pavlo Baron as a spin-off of Codecentric (which was founded in 2005).

By December 2017, it had received a total of $26 million from investors, and by October 2018, this had risen to a total of $57 million. However, this investment came primarily from outside Germany. $20 million of this funding was raised in the series B round led by Accel Partners whilst $30 million of this total was raised in the series C round led by Meritech Capital Partners. In February 2019, the company employed more than 100 employees in different sites around Solingen, including in the suburb of Ohligs.

In November 2020, IBM, as part of continuing investments in big data and AI, announced an agreement to acquire Instana.
