= Dynatrace =

American technology company

Dynatrace, Inc.

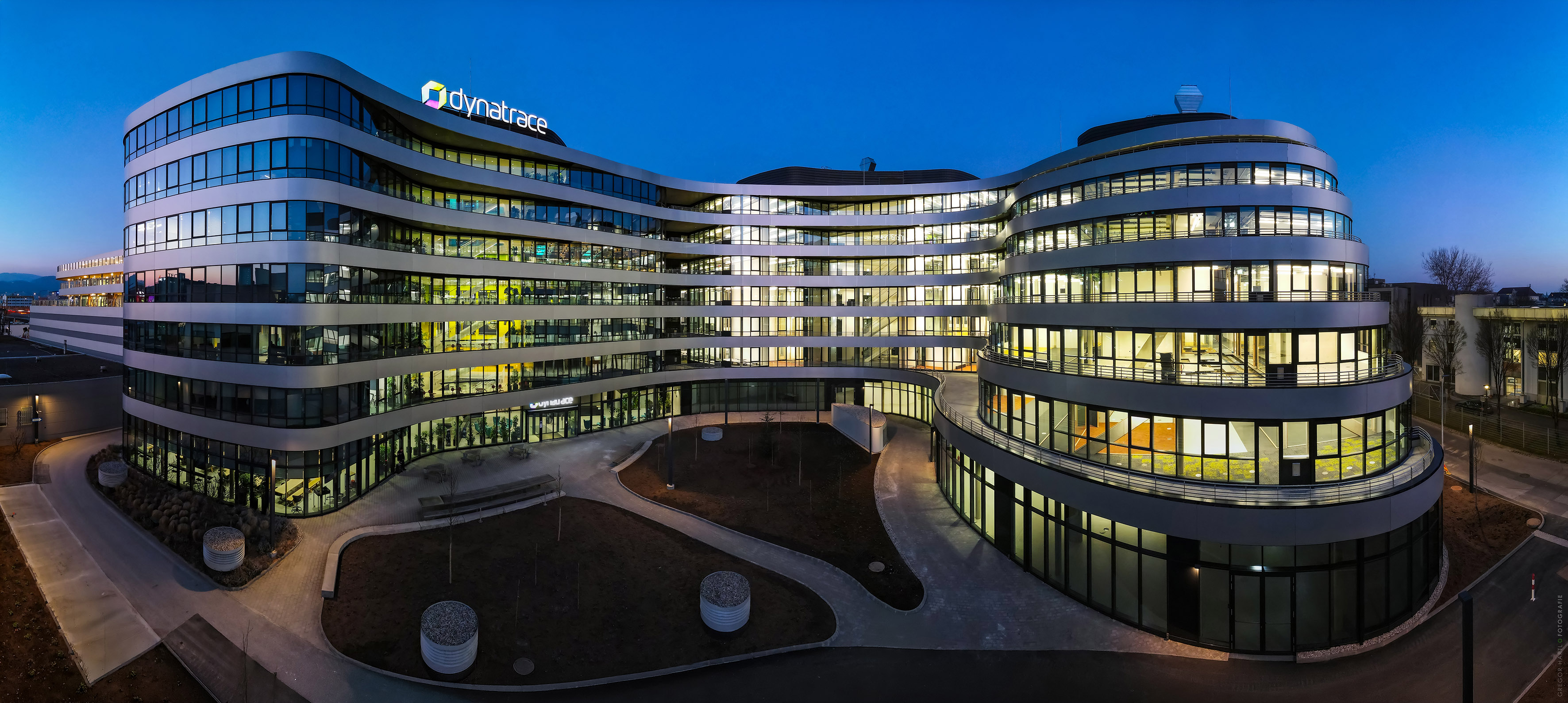
- Type: Public company
- Traded as: NYSE: DT; S&P 400 component
- Industry: Application performance monitoring; Application security; AIOps; Digital business analytics; IT operations analytics; Infrastructure monitoring; Log management; Digital experience; Observability
- Founded: 2005; 21 years ago
- Headquarters: Boston, U.S.
- Area served: Worldwide
- Key people: Rick McConnell (CEO); Jim Benson (CFO); Nicole Fitzpatrick (CLO); Bernd Greifeneder (CTO and Founder); Colleen Kozak (Chief Transformation Officer); Steve McMahon (CCO); Michael Rogers (CPO); Alex Scheran (SVP, Software Development); Steve Tack (CPO); Dan Zugelder (CRO)
- Revenue: ▲US$2.0 billion (2026)
- Net income: ▼US$163 million (2026)
- Total assets: ▲US$4.4 billion (2026)
- Total equity: ▼US$2.6 billion (2026)
- Number of employees: ≈5,600 (2026)
- Website: www.dynatrace.com

Dynatrace, Inc. is an American multinational technology company that provides an AI-powered observability platform. Their software is used to monitor, analyze, and optimize application performance, software development, cyber security practices, IT infrastructure, and user experience.

Dynatrace uses a proprietary form of artificial intelligence called Dynatrace Intelligence to discover, map, and monitor applications, microservices, container orchestration platforms such as Kubernetes, and IT infrastructure running in multicloud, hybrid-cloud, and hyperscale network environments. The platform also provides automated problem remediation and IT carbon impact analysis.

== Products and services ==
Platform components include infrastructure monitoring, applications and microservices monitoring, log management and analytics, application security, digital experience, business observability, AI observability, and cloud automation.

- OneAgent: Automated data collection
- SmartScape: Continuously updated topology mapping
- PurePath: Code-level distributed tracing
- AppEngine: Low-code app development for observability/security/business data
- AutomationEngine: Automated DevOps workflows
- Grail data lakehouse: Indexless, schema-on-read storage for analytics with DQL query language
- Dynatrace Intelligence: Causal AI, predictive analytics, generative AI for root-cause analysis and AI observability predictive analytics, and generative AI.

The platform includes the Dynatrace Hub for publishing specific observability applications and integrations with more than 900 technologies including AWS, Docker, Java, and Prometheus.

In October 2022, Dynatrace introduced Grail, a data lakehouse that underpins the platform's log management and analytics capabilities, allowing logs to be stored and queried alongside metrics and traces.

Dynatrace also offers AI observability for monitoring LLMs and AI agents in production. In August 2026, the company announced it would acquire Arize, developer of the Arize AX platform for evaluating LLM applications, to expand these capabilities.

Dynatrace provides multicloud observability to both SaaS and managed service deployment models, in partnership with service providers including Amazon Web Services, Microsoft Azure, and Google Cloud Platform.

== Open source contributions ==
Dynatrace supports CNCF projects including Keptn, W3C Trace Context, OpenTelemetry, and OpenFeature.

== History ==
Dynatrace was founded in 2005 in Linz, Austria as dynaTrace Software GmbH. The company was acquired by Compuware in 2011, then taken private by Thoma Bravo in 2014 and renamed Dynatrace. In 2015, it merged with Keynote Systems. The company went public on the New York Stock Exchange in 2019.

Rick McConnell has been CEO since 2021.

== Acquisitions ==
- Keynote Systems (2015): Application performance management
- Matrix.net / Xaffire: Internet performance metrics and analysis
- Qumram (2017): Session replay technology
- SpectX (2021): High-speed parsing and analytics
- Rookout (2023): Developer-first observability
- Runecast (2024): AI-powered security and compliance solutions
- Metis (2025): AI-driven database observability
- DevCycle (2026): Feature management and experimentation platform
- Bindplane (2026): Unified telemetry pipeline built on OpenTelemetry
- Arize (2026): AI engineering platform for self-improving agents
