= Network utility =

A network utility is utility software for analyzing and configuring networking. Many such utilities were originally developed for Unix and later ported to other operating systems.

== Examples ==
Tools found on most operating systems include:

ifconfig
For network interface configuration. Available on Unix-like systems. In many Linux distributions, deprecated in favor of iproute2.
ipconfig
Similar to ifconfig. Available on Windows systems.
iproute2
Collection of utilities for network configuration. Available on Linux systems.
ping
Checks connectivity with a host. Reports packet loss and latency. Uses ICMP. Broadly available for many systems.
route
Displays an IP routing table.
netsh
Allows local or remote configuration of network devices. Available on Windows.
netstat
Displays network connections (both incoming and outgoing), routing tables, and a number of network interface and network protocol statistics. It is used for finding problems in the network and to determine the amount of traffic on the network as a performance measurement.
nslookup
Queries a Domain Name System (DNS) server for DNS data. Deprecated on Unix systems in favor of host and dig. As of 2006, the preferred tool for Windows.
spray
Sends numerous packets to a host and reports results.
traceroute
Shows the series of successive systems a packet goes through en route to its destination on a network. It works by sending packets with sequential TTLs which generate ICMP TTL-exceeded messages from the hosts the packet passes through. Broadly available for many systems.
vnStat
Monitors network traffic from the console. It allows to keep the traffic information in a log system to be analyzed by third party tools.
