= IP address =

Numerical label used to identify a network interface in an IP network

An Internet Protocol address (IP address) is a numerical label, such as 192.168.1.1 or 2001:0db8:0000:0000:0000:8a2e:0370:7334, that is assigned to a device connected to a computer network that uses the Internet Protocol for communication. IP addresses serve two main functions: network interface identification, and location addressing.

Internet Protocol version 4 (IPv4) was the first standalone specification for the IP address, and has been in use since 1983. IPv4 addresses are defined as a 32-bit number, which later became too small to provide enough addresses as the internet grew, leading to IPv4 address exhaustion over the 2010s. Its designated successor, IPv6, uses 128 bits for the IP address, giving it a larger address space. Although IPv6 deployment has been ongoing since the mid-2000s, both IPv4 and IPv6 are still used side-by-side as of 2026, with IPv6 recently exceeding 50% globally after 18 years.

IP addresses are usually displayed in a human-readable notation, but systems may use them in various different computer number formats. CIDR notation can also be used to designate how much of the address should be treated as a routing prefix. For example, 192.0.2.1/24 indicates that 24 significant bits of the address are the prefix, with the remaining 8 bits used for host addressing. This is equivalent to the historically used subnet mask (in this case, 255.255.255.0).

The IP address space is managed globally by the Internet Assigned Numbers Authority (IANA) and the five regional Internet registries (RIRs). IANA assigns blocks of IP addresses to the RIRs, which are responsible for distributing them to local Internet registries in their region, such as internet service providers (ISPs) and large institutions. Some addresses are reserved for private networks and are not globally unique.

Within a network, the network administrator assigns an IP address to each device. Such assignments may be on a static (fixed or permanent) or dynamic basis, depending on network practices and software features. Some jurisdictions, such as Canada and the European Union, consider IP addresses to be personal data.

== Function ==
An IP address serves two principal functions: it identifies the host, or more specifically, its network interface, and it provides the location of the host in the network, and thus the capability of establishing a path to that host. Its role has been characterized as follows: "A name indicates what we seek. An address indicates where it is. A route indicates how to get there." The header of each IP packet contains the IP address of the sending host and that of the destination host.

== IP versions ==
Two versions of the Internet Protocol are in common use on the Internet today. The original version of the Internet Protocol that was first deployed in 1983 in the ARPANET, the predecessor of the Internet, is Internet Protocol version 4 (IPv4).

By the early 1990s, the rapid exhaustion of IPv4 address space available for assignment to Internet service providers and end-user organizations prompted the Internet Engineering Task Force (IETF) to explore new technologies to expand addressing capability on the Internet. The result was a redesign of the Internet Protocol, which eventually became known as Internet Protocol Version 6 (IPv6) in 1995. IPv6 technology was in various testing stages until the mid-2000s, when commercial production deployment commenced.

Today, these two versions of the Internet Protocol are in simultaneous use. Among other technical changes, each version defines the format of addresses differently. Because of the historical prevalence of IPv4, the generic term IP address typically still refers to the addresses defined by IPv4. The gap in version sequence between IPv4 and IPv6 resulted from the assignment of version 5 to the experimental Internet Stream Protocol in 1979, which, however, was never referred to as IPv5.

Versions 1 to 9 were defined, but only 4 and 6 ever gained widespread use. Transmission Control Protocol (the protocol suite later referred to as TCP/IP) versions 1 and 2 were published in 1974 and 1977. Version 3 was defined in 1978, and version 3.1 is the first version in which TCP is separated from IP. Version 6 is a synthesis of several suggested versions, version 6 Simple Internet Protocol, version 7 TP/IX: The Next Internet, version 8 P. Internet Protocol, and version 9 TCP and UDP with Bigger Addresses (TUBA).

== Subnetworks ==
IP networks may be divided into subnetworks in both IPv4 and IPv6. For this purpose, an IP address is recognized as consisting of two parts: the network prefix in the high-order bits and the remaining bits called the rest field, host identifier, or interface identifier (IPv6), used for host numbering within a network. The subnet mask or CIDR notation determines how the IP address is divided into network and host parts.

The term subnet mask is only used within IPv4. Both IP versions, however, use the CIDR concept and notation. In this, the IP address is followed by a slash and the number (in decimal) of bits used for the network part, also called the routing prefix. For example, an IPv4 address and its subnet mask may be 192.0.2.1 and 255.255.255.0, respectively. The CIDR notation for the same IP address and subnet is 192.0.2.1/24, because the first 24 bits of the IP address indicate the network and subnet.

== IPv4 addresses ==
Decomposition of an IPv4 address from dot-decimal notation to its binary value

An IPv4 address has a size of 32 bits, which limits the address space to 4294967296 (2^{32}) addresses. Of this number, some addresses are reserved for special purposes such as private networks (≈18 million addresses) and multicast addressing (≈270 million addresses).

IPv4 addresses are usually represented in dot-decimal notation, consisting of four decimal numbers, each ranging from 0 to 255, separated by dots, e.g., 192.0.2.1. Each part represents a group of 8 bits (an octet) of the address. In some cases of technical writing, IPv4 addresses may be presented in various hexadecimal, octal, or binary representations.

=== Subnetting history ===
In the early stages of development of the Internet Protocol, the network number was always the highest-order octet (most significant eight bits). Because this method allowed for only 256 networks, it soon proved inadequate as additional networks developed that were independent of the existing networks already designated by a network number. In 1981, the addressing specification was revised with the introduction of classful network architecture.

Classful network design allowed for a larger number of individual network assignments and fine-grained subnetwork design. The first three bits of the most significant octet of an IP address were defined as the class of the address. Three classes (A, B, and C) were defined for universal unicast addressing. Depending on the class derived, the network identification was based on octet boundary segments of the entire address. Each class used successively additional octets in the network identifier, thus reducing the possible number of hosts in the higher-order classes (B and C). The following table gives an overview of this now-obsolete system.

Historical classful network architecture
Class	Leading bits	Size of network number bit field	Size of rest bit field	Number of networks	Number of addresses per network	Start address	End address
A	0	8	24	128 (2^{7})	16777216 (2^{24})	0.0.0.0	127.255.255.255
B	10	16	16	16384 (2^{14})	65536 (2^{16})	128.0.0.0	191.255.255.255
C	110	24	8	2097152 (2^{21})	256 (2^{8})	192.0.0.0	223.255.255.255

Classful network design served its purpose in the startup stage of the Internet, but it lacked scalability in the face of the rapid expansion of networking in the 1990s. The class system of the address space was replaced with Classless Inter-Domain Routing (CIDR) in 1993. CIDR is based on variable-length subnet masking (VLSM) to allow allocation and routing based on arbitrary-length prefixes. Today, remnants of classful network concepts function only in a limited scope as the default configuration parameters of some network software and hardware components (e.g. netmask), and in the technical jargon used in network administrators' discussions.

=== Private addresses ===
Early network design, when global end-to-end connectivity was envisioned for communications with all Internet hosts, intended that IP addresses be globally unique. However, it was found that this was not always necessary as private networks developed and public address space needed to be conserved.

Computers not connected to the Internet, such as factory machines that communicate only with each other via TCP/IP, need not have globally unique IP addresses. Today, such private networks are widely used and typically connect to the Internet with network address translation (NAT), when needed.

Three non-overlapping ranges of IPv4 addresses for private networks are reserved. These addresses are not routed on the Internet, and thus their use need not be coordinated with an IP address registry. Any user may use any of the reserved blocks. Typically, a network administrator will divide a block into subnets; for example, many home routers automatically use a default address range of 192.168.0.0 through 192.168.0.255 (192.168.0.0/24).

Reserved private IPv4 network ranges
Name	CIDR block	Address range	Number of addresses	Classful description
24-bit block	10.0.0.0/8	10.0.0.0 – 10.255.255.255	16777216	Single Class A
20-bit block	172.16.0.0/12	172.16.0.0 – 172.31.255.255	1048576	Contiguous range of 16 Class B blocks
16-bit block	192.168.0.0/16	192.168.0.0 – 192.168.255.255	65536	Contiguous range of 256 Class C blocks

== IPv6 addresses ==
Decomposition of an IPv6 address from hexadecimal representation to its binary value

In IPv6, the address size was increased from 32 bits in IPv4 to 128 bits, thus providing up to 2^{128} (approximately 3.403×10^{38}) addresses. This is deemed sufficient for the foreseeable future.

IPv6 addresses are usually written as eight groups of four hexadecimal digits separated by colons, each group representing 16 bits, for example 2001:0db8:0000:0000:0000:8a2e:0370:7334. Leading zeros in a group may be omitted, and one run of consecutive all-zero groups may be replaced by a double colon (::), which may appear only once in an address. The recommended form uses lowercase letters, drops leading zeros, and applies the double colon to the longest run of zero groups, so the example above is written 2001:db8::8a2e:370:7334. As in IPv4, a prefix length is appended in CIDR notation, as in 2001:db8::/32. Because a colon also separates a host from a port number, an IPv6 address in a URL is enclosed in square brackets, as in https://[2001:db8::1]/.

The intent of the new design was not to provide just a sufficient quantity of addresses, but also to redesign routing in the Internet by allowing more efficient aggregation of subnetwork routing prefixes. This resulted in slower growth of routing tables in routers. The smallest possible individual allocation is a subnet for 2^{64} hosts, which is the square of the size of the entire IPv4 Internet. At these levels, actual address utilization ratios will be small on any IPv6 network segment. The new design also provides the opportunity to separate the addressing infrastructure of a network segment, i.e., the local administration of the segment's available space, from the addressing prefix used to route traffic to and from external networks. IPv6 has facilities that automatically change the routing prefix of entire networks, should the global connectivity or the routing policy change, without requiring internal redesign or manual renumbering.

The large number of IPv6 addresses allows large blocks to be assigned for specific purposes and, where appropriate, to be aggregated for efficient routing. With a large address space, there is no need to have complex address conservation methods as used in CIDR.

=== Unique local and link-local addresses ===
Just as IPv4 reserves addresses for private networks, blocks of addresses are set aside in IPv6. In IPv6, these are referred to as unique local addresses (ULAs). The routing prefix fc00::/7 is reserved for this block, which is divided into two /8 blocks with different implied policies. The addresses include a 40-bit pseudorandom number that minimizes the risk of address collisions if sites merge or packets are misrouted.

Early practices used a different block for this purpose (fec0::), dubbed site-local addresses. However, the definition of what constituted a site remained unclear and the poorly defined addressing policy created ambiguities for routing. This address type was abandoned and must not be used in new systems.

Addresses starting with fe80::, called link-local addresses, are assigned to interfaces for communication on the attached link. The addresses are automatically generated by the operating system for each network interface. This provides instant and automatic communication between all IPv6 hosts on a link. This feature is used in the lower layers of IPv6 network administration, such as for the Neighbor Discovery Protocol.

Private and link-local address prefixes may not be routed on the public Internet.

== Special-purpose addresses ==
Besides the private and link-local ranges, both versions of the protocol reserve further blocks of addresses for particular uses. These are recorded in registries maintained by IANA.

A loopback address lets a host send packets to itself. Such packets never leave the host. IPv4 reserves the block 127.0.0.0/8 for this purpose, and IPv6 the single address ::1 (see localhost).

The address 0.0.0.0 in IPv4 and the unspecified address :: in IPv6 stand in for a host's own address when it does not yet have one. A host may use them as the source address of packets it sends while it is still learning its address, and they are never used as a destination.

Some blocks are set aside for use in examples and documentation, so that sample addresses do not collide with addresses in real use: 192.0.2.0/24, 198.51.100.0/24 and 203.0.113.0/24 in IPv4, and 2001:db8::/32 in IPv6.

== IP address assignment ==
IP addresses are assigned to a host either dynamically as they join the network, or persistently by configuration of the host hardware or software. Persistent configuration is also known as using a static IP address. In contrast, when a computer's IP address is assigned each time it restarts, this is known as using a dynamic IP address.

Dynamic IP addresses are assigned by the network. The Dynamic Host Configuration Protocol (DHCP) lets a server assign addresses automatically from a pool, each for a limited period. It avoids the administrative burden of assigning specific static addresses to each device on a network. It also allows devices to share the limited address space on a network if only some of them are online at a particular time. Typically, dynamic IP configuration is enabled by default in modern desktop operating systems.

The address assigned with DHCP is associated with a lease and usually has an expiration period. If the lease is not renewed by the host before expiry, the address may be assigned to another device. Some DHCP implementations attempt to reassign the same IP address to a host, based on its MAC address, each time it joins the network. A network administrator may configure a DHCP server to allocate specific IP addresses to specific MAC addresses.

DHCP is not the only technology used to assign IP addresses dynamically. Bootstrap Protocol is a similar protocol and predecessor to DHCP. Dialup and some broadband networks use dynamic address features of the Point-to-Point Protocol.

Computers and equipment used for the network infrastructure, such as routers and mail servers, are typically configured with static addressing.

In the absence or failure of static or dynamic address configuration, an IPv4 host may assign itself a link-local address (see § Address autoconfiguration).

=== IPv6 address assignment ===
In IPv6, hosts commonly configure their own addresses using stateless address autoconfiguration (SLAAC). A router on the link announces the network prefix in router advertisement messages. Each host combines that prefix with an interface identifier that it generates itself, and checks that no other device on the link is already using the resulting address. No server has to keep track of which host holds which address.

Early implementations derived the interface identifier from the interface's MAC address, which made a device recognizable as it moved between networks. Later specifications define identifiers that stay the same on one network but differ from one network to another, and temporary addresses that are replaced periodically.

IPv6 addresses can also be assigned by a server using DHCPv6, in place of or in addition to SLAAC. DHCPv6 can also delegate an entire prefix to a router, for example from an ISP to a customer's router (prefix delegation).

=== Sticky dynamic IP address ===
Sticky is an informal term used to describe a dynamically assigned IP address that seldom changes. IPv4 addresses, for example, are usually assigned with DHCP, and a DHCP service can use rules that maximize the chance of assigning the same address each time a client asks for an assignment. In IPv6, a prefix delegation can be handled similarly, to make changes as rare as feasible. In a typical home or small-office setup, a single router is the only device visible to an Internet service provider (ISP), and the ISP may try to provide a configuration that is as stable as feasible, i.e., sticky. On the local network of the home or business, a local DHCP server may be designed to provide sticky IPv4 configurations, and the ISP may provide a sticky IPv6 prefix delegation, giving clients the option to use sticky IPv6 addresses. Sticky should not be confused with static; sticky configurations have no guarantee of stability, while static configurations are used indefinitely and only changed deliberately.

=== Address autoconfiguration ===
Address block 169.254.0.0/16 is defined for the special use of link-local addressing for IPv4 networks. In IPv6, every interface, whether using static or dynamic addresses, also receives a link-local address automatically in the block fe80::/10. These addresses are only valid on the link, such as a local network segment or point-to-point connection, to which a host is connected. These addresses are not routable and, like private addresses, cannot be the source or destination of packets traversing the Internet.

When the link-local IPv4 address block was reserved, no standards existed for mechanisms of address autoconfiguration. Filling the void, Microsoft developed a protocol called Automatic Private IP Addressing (APIPA), whose first public implementation appeared in Windows 98. APIPA has been deployed on millions of machines and became a de facto standard in the industry. In May 2005, the IETF defined a formal standard for it.

=== Addressing conflicts ===
An IP address conflict occurs when two devices on the same local physical or wireless network claim to have the same IP address. A second assignment of an address generally stops the IP functionality of one or both of the devices. Many modern operating systems notify the administrator of IP address conflicts. When IP addresses are assigned by multiple people and systems with differing methods, any of them may be at fault. If one of the devices involved in the conflict is the default gateway access beyond the LAN for all devices on the LAN, all devices may be impaired.

== Routing ==
IP addresses are classified into several classes of operational characteristics: unicast, multicast, anycast and broadcast addressing.

=== Unicast addressing ===
The most common concept of an IP address is in unicast addressing, available in both IPv4 and IPv6. It normally refers to a single sender or a single receiver, and can be used for both sending and receiving. Usually, a unicast address is associated with a single device or host, but a device or host may have more than one unicast address. Sending the same data to multiple unicast addresses requires the sender to send all the data many times over, once for each recipient.

=== Broadcast addressing ===
Broadcasting is an addressing technique available in IPv4 to address data to all possible destinations on a network in one transmission operation as an all-hosts broadcast. All receivers capture the network packet. The address 255.255.255.255 is used for network broadcast. In addition, a more limited directed broadcast uses the all-ones host address with the network prefix. For example, the destination address used for directed broadcast to devices on the network 192.0.2.0/24 is 192.0.2.255.

IPv6 does not implement broadcast addressing and replaces it with multicast to the specially defined all-nodes multicast address.

=== Multicast addressing ===
A multicast address is associated with a group of interested receivers. In IPv4, addresses 224.0.0.0 through 239.255.255.255 (the former Class D addresses) are designated as multicast addresses. IPv6 uses the address block with the prefix ff00::/8 for multicast. In either case, the sender sends a single datagram from its unicast address to the multicast group address, and the intermediary routers take care of making copies and sending them to all interested receivers (those that have joined the corresponding multicast group).

=== Anycast addressing ===
An anycast address is shared by several interfaces, usually on different hosts. A packet addressed to it reaches only one of them, normally the one the routing system considers nearest. IPv6 defines anycast addresses as part of its addressing architecture. They are drawn from the unicast address space and have the same format as unicast addresses. In both IPv4 and IPv6, anycast across the Internet is usually implemented by announcing the same prefix from several locations with the Border Gateway Protocol. Anycast is used for global load balancing and is common in distributed DNS systems.

== Geolocation ==
A host may use geolocation to deduce the geographic position of its communicating peer. This is typically done by retrieving geolocation info about the IP address of the other node from a database.

== Public address ==
A public IP address is a globally routable unicast address, that is, one outside the ranges reserved for private networks, link-local use and other special purposes. Public addresses are used for communication between hosts on the global Internet.

In IPv4, an ISP may assign a single public address to a home or small-office network. The address is configured on the router, and the devices behind it use private addresses and share the public address through network address translation (see § Address translation).

Because of the scarcity of IPv4 addresses, some ISPs do not assign a public IPv4 address to each customer. With carrier-grade NAT, one public address is shared among several customers, and the customer's router is assigned an address that is not globally routable. The block 100.64.0.0/10 is reserved for this purpose.

In IPv6, the size of the address space makes address sharing through NAT unnecessary, and each device on a customer's network can be assigned its own globally routable address.

A public address may be static or dynamic (see § IP address assignment).

== Address translation ==
Multiple client devices can appear to share an IP address, either because they are part of a shared web hosting service environment or because an IPv4 network address translation (NAT) device or proxy server acts as an intermediary agent on behalf of the client, in which case the real originating IP address is masked from the server receiving a request. A common practice is to have a NAT device mask many devices in a private network. Only the public interfaces of the NAT device need to have an Internet-routable address.

The NAT device maps different IP addresses on the private network to different TCP or UDP port numbers on the public network. In residential networks, NAT functions are usually implemented in a residential gateway. In this scenario, the computers connected to the router have private IP addresses, and the router has a public address on its external interface to communicate on the Internet. The internal computers appear to share one public IP address.

== Law ==
In March 2024, the Supreme Court of Canada decided that IP addresses for users are protected private information under the Canadian Charter of Rights and Freedoms, with police searches requiring a warrant in order to obtain them. IP addresses are considered personal data by the European Commission and are protected by the General Data Protection Regulation. In the United States, the California Consumer Privacy Act only protects IP addresses that link to any particular consumer or household; otherwise it is not private data and is not protected under American law.

== Diagnostic tools ==
Computer operating systems provide various diagnostic tools to examine network interfaces and address configuration. Microsoft Windows provides the command-line interface tools ipconfig and netsh and users of Unix-like systems may use ifconfig, netstat, route, and iproute2 utilities to accomplish the task.

== See also ==
- Hostname
- IP address blocking
- IP address spoofing
- IP aliasing
- IP multicast
- List of assigned /8 IPv4 address blocks
- Reverse DNS lookup
- Virtual IP address
- WHOIS
