= Operating system Wi-Fi support =

Support in the operating system for Wi-Fi

Operating system Wi-Fi support is defined as the facilities an operating system may include for Wi-Fi networking. It usually consists of two pieces of software: device drivers, and applications for configuration and management.

Driver support is typically provided by chipset manufacturers or device manufacturers. For Unix-like systems such as Linux, drivers are often developed through open-source projects.

Configuration and management support consists of software to enumerate, join, and check the status of available Wi-Fi networks. This also includes support for various encryption methods. These systems are often provided by the operating system backed by a standard driver model. In most cases, drivers emulate an Ethernet device and use the configuration and management utilities built into the operating system. In cases where built-in configuration and management support is non-existent or inadequate, hardware manufacturers may include software to handle those tasks.

== Microsoft Windows ==
Microsoft Windows has comprehensive driver-level support for Wi-Fi, the quality of which depends on the hardware manufacturer. Hardware manufacturers commonly ship Windows drivers with their products. Configuration and management depend on the version of Windows.

- Earlier versions of Windows, such as 98, ME, and 2000 do not have built-in configuration and management support and must depend on software provided by the manufacturer.
- Microsoft Windows XP has built-in configuration and management support. The original shipping version of Windows XP included basic support which was enhanced in Service Pack 2. Support for WPA2 and some other security protocols require updates from Microsoft. Many hardware manufacturers include their software and require the user to disable Windows’ built-in Wi-Fi support.
- Windows Vista, Windows 7, Windows 8, Windows 10, and Windows 11 have improved Wi-Fi support over Windows XP with a better interface and enhanced features. Windows 10 and later include native support for Wi-Fi 6 and WPA3, though some older hardware may require driver updates.

== macOS and Classic Mac OS ==
Apple introduced its AirPort product line, based on the 802.11b standard, in July 1999. Apple later introduced AirPort Extreme, an implementation of 802.11g. All Apple computers, starting with the original iBook in 1999, either included AirPort 802.11 networking or were designed specifically to provide 802.11 networking with only the addition of the internal AirPort Card (or, later, an AirPort Extreme Card) connecting to the computer's built-in antennae. In late 2006, Apple began shipping Macs with Broadcom Wi-Fi chips that also supported the Draft 802.11n standard, but this capability was disabled and Apple did not claim or advertise the hardware's capability until some time later when the draft had progressed further. At the January 2007 Macworld Expo, Apple announced that their computers would begin shipping with Draft 802.11n support. Modern versions of macOS, such as macOS Ventura and macOS Sonoma, include support for Wi-Fi 6 and WPA3 on compatible hardware. Apple integrates Wi-Fi functionality deeply with its ecosystem features.

Apple produces the operating system, computer hardware, accompanying drivers, AirPort Wi-Fi base stations, and configuration and management software. The built-in configuration and management are integrated throughout many of the operating system's applications and utilities. macOS has Wi-Fi support, including WPA2, and ships with drivers for all of Apple's current and past AirPort Extreme and AirPort cards. macOS also supports extending this functionality through external third-party hardware. MacOS also supports extending this functionality through external third-party hardware.

Mac OS 9 supported AirPort and AirPort Extreme as well, and drivers exist for other equipment from other manufacturers, providing Wi-Fi options for earlier systems not designed for AirPort cards. Versions of Mac OS before Mac OS 9 predate Wi-Fi technology, although some third-party hardware manufacturers have made drivers and connection software that allow earlier versions to use Wi-Fi.

== Open-source Unix-like systems ==
Linux, FreeBSD and similar Unix-like systems provide varying levels of Wi-Fi support that differ from proprietary operating systems. Due to the open source nature of these operating systems, many different standards have been developed for configuring and managing Wi-Fi devices. The open source nature also fosters open source drivers which have enabled many third party and proprietary devices to work under these operating systems. See Comparison of Open Source Wireless Drivers for more information on those drivers.

- Linux has optional Wi-Fi support, but this is not a requirement. This is especially true for older kernel versions, such as the 2.6 series, which is still widely used by enterprise distributions. Native drivers for many Wi-Fi chipsets are available either commercially or at no cost, although some manufacturers don't produce a Linux driver, only a Windows one. Consequently, many popular chipsets either don't have a native Linux driver at all, or only have a half-finished one. For these, the freely available NdisWrapper and its commercial competitor DriverLoader allow Windows x86 and 64 bit variants NDIS drivers to be used on x86-based Linux systems and 86_64 architectures as of January 6, 2005. As well as the lack of native drivers, some Linux distributions do not offer a convenient user interface and configuring Wi-Fi on them can be a clumsy and complicated operation compared to configuring wired Ethernet drivers. This is changing with the adoption of utilities such as NetworkManager and wicd that allow users to automatically switch between networks, without root access or command-line invocation of the traditional wireless tools. Certain distributions, such as Ubuntu, provide extensive preinstalled driver support. Linux has improved Wi-Fi support in recent years, with modern kernels (5.15+) including better support for chipsets from Intel, Qualcomm, and MediaTek.
- FreeBSD has Wi-Fi support similar to Linux. FreeBSD 7.0 introduced full support for WPA and WPA2, although in some cases this is driver dependent. FreeBSD comes with drivers for many wireless cards and chipsets, including those made by Atheros, Intel Centrino, Ralink, Cisco, D-link, and Netgear, and provides support for others through the ports collection. FreeBSD also has "Project Evil", which provides the ability to use Windows x86 NDIS drivers on x86-based FreeBSD systems as NdisWrapper does on Linux, and Windows amd64 NDIS drivers on amd64-based systems.
- NetBSD, OpenBSD, and DragonFly BSD have Wi-Fi support similar to FreeBSD. Code for some of the drivers, as well as the kernel framework to support them, is mostly shared among the 4 BSDs.
- Haiku has had preliminary Wi-Fi support since September 2009.
- Solaris and OpenSolaris have the Wireless Networking Project to provide Wi-Fi drivers and support.
- Android has built in support for WiFi, with it being preferred over mobile telephony networks.
- Unison OS has built in support for embedded WiFi for a broad set of modules, with it being preferred over mobile telephony networks (which also have off the shelf support). Mixed WiFi and Bluetooth for embedded systems is also provided.

== See also ==
- List of WLAN channels
- Wireless access point
