= Service set =

Service set may refer to:

- Service set (802.11 network), a particular 802.11 wireless network
  - Service set identifier, a name given to that network
  - Basic Service Set, the group of devices associated to an access point
  - Extended Service Set, the entire campus of a wireless network using the same identifier
- Tea service, a formal tea set
