= Network manager =

Network manager may refer to:

- Network administrator, profession
- NetworkManager, software utility for Linux and other Unix-like operating systems
