= WICD =

WICD or Wicd may refer to:

- WICD (TV), a television station (channel 15) licensed to Champaign, Illinois, United States
- a defunct television station in Urbana, Illinois
- Wicd, a network manager software for Linux systems
