= ConnMan =

Linux internet connection manager

- Original authors: Intel, Marcel Holtmann
- Release: December 6, 2008; 17 years ago
- Stable release: 2.0 / 9 February 2026; 7 months ago
- Written in: C
- Available in: English
- License: GNU GPL
- Website: web.archive.org/web/20210224075615/https://01.org/connman
- Repository: git.kernel.org/cgit/network/connman/connman.git/

ConnMan is an internet connection manager for embedded devices running the Linux operating system.

The Connection Manager is designed to be slim and to use as few resources as possible, so it can be easily integrated. It is a fully modular system that can be extended through plug-ins to support all kinds of wired or wireless technologies. Configuration methods like DHCP and domain name resolving are implemented using plug-ins. The plug-in approach allows for easy adaptation and modification for various use cases.

Originally created as part of Intel's Moblin effort, it is now used by OpenELEC as well as Sailfish OS by Jolla. It is also used in Google Nest products, including Nest Cam, Nest Guard, Nest Hello, and Nest Learning Thermostat.

== See also ==
- NetworkManager
- netifd
- Wicd
