= Wireless network interface controller =

Hardware component that connects a computer to a wireless computer network

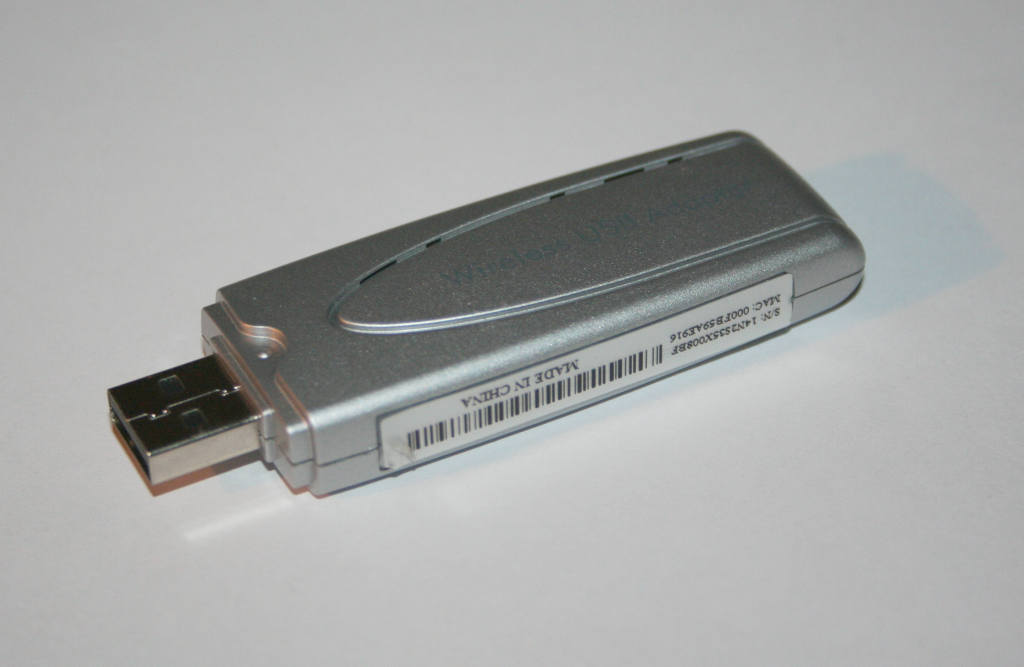
A wireless network interface device with a USB interface and internal antenna

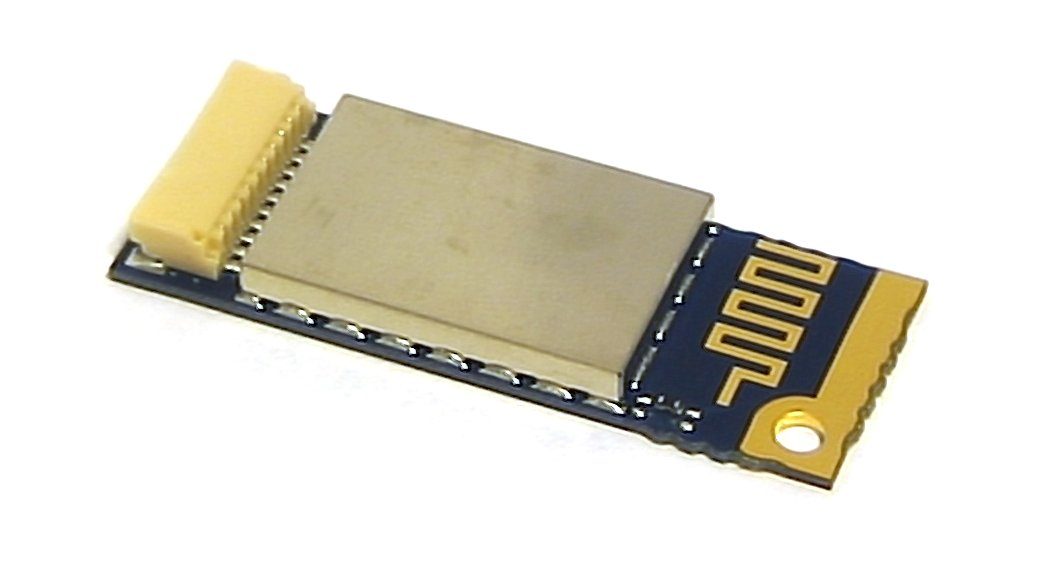
A Bluetooth interface card

A wireless network interface controller (WNIC) is a network interface controller that connects to a wireless network, such as Wi-Fi, Bluetooth, or LTE (4G) or 5G rather than a wired network, such as an Ethernet network. It consists of a modem, an automated radio transmitter and receiver which operate in the background, exchanging digital data in the form of data packets with other wireless devices or wireless routers using radio waves radiated by an antenna, linking the devices together transparently in a computer network. A WNIC, just like other network interface controllers (NICs), works on layers 1 and 2 of the OSI model.

A wireless network interface controller may be implemented as an expansion card and connected using PCI bus or PCIe bus, or connected via USB, PC Card, ExpressCard, Mini PCIe or M.2.

The low cost and ubiquity of the Wi-Fi standard means that many newer mobile computers have a wireless network interface built into the motherboard.

The term is usually applied to adapters using the Wi-Fi (IEEE 802.11) network protocol; it may also apply to a NIC using protocols other than 802.11, such as one implementing Bluetooth connections.

== Modes of operation ==
An 802.11 WNIC can operate in two modes known as infrastructure mode and ad hoc mode:

Infrastructure mode
In an infrastructure mode network, the WNIC needs a wireless access point: all data is transferred using the access point as the central hub. All wireless nodes in an infrastructure mode network connect to an access point. All nodes connecting to the access point must have the same service set identifier (SSID) as the access point. If wireless security is enabled on the access point (such as WEP or WPA), the NIC must have valid authentication parameters in order to connect to the access point.

Ad hoc mode
In an ad hoc mode network, the WNIC does not require an access point, but rather can interface with all other wireless nodes directly. All the nodes in an ad hoc network must have the same channel and SSID.

== Specifications ==
The IEEE 802.11 standard sets out low-level specifications for how all 802.11 wireless networks operate. Earlier 802.11 interface controllers are usually only compatible with earlier variants of the standard, while newer cards support both current and old standards.

Specifications commonly used in marketing materials for WNICs include:

- Wireless data transfer rates (measured in Mbit/s)
- Wireless transmit power (measured in dBm)
- Wireless network standards supported, such as 802.11b, 802.11a, 802.11g, 802.11n, 802.11ac, 802.11ax

Most WNICs support one or more of 802.11, Bluetooth and 3GPP (2G, 3G, 4G, 5G) network standards.

== Range ==
Wireless range may be substantially affected by objects in the way of the signal and by the quality of the antenna. Large electrical appliances, such as refrigerators, fuse boxes, metal plumbing, and air conditioning units, can impede a wireless network signal. The theoretical maximum range of IEEE 802.11 is only reached under ideal circumstances and true effective range is typically about half of the theoretical range. Specifically, the maximum throughput speed is only achieved at extremely close range (less than 25 feet (7.6 m) or so); at the outer reaches of a device's effective range, speed may decrease to around 1 Mbit/s before it drops out altogether. The reason is that wireless devices dynamically negotiate the top speed at which they can communicate without dropping too many data packets.

== FullMAC and SoftMAC devices ==
In an 802.11 WNIC, the MAC Sublayer Management Entity (MLME) can be implemented either in the NIC's hardware or firmware, or in host-based software that is executed on the main CPU. A WNIC that implements the MLME function in hardware or firmware is called a FullMAC WNIC or a HardMAC NIC and a NIC that implements it in host software is called a SoftMAC NIC.

A FullMAC device hides the complexity of the 802.11 protocol from the main CPU, instead providing an 802.3 (Ethernet) interface; a SoftMAC design implements only the timing-critical part of the protocol in hardware/firmware and the rest on the host.

FullMAC chips are typically used in mobile devices because:

- they are easier to integrate in complete products
- power is saved by having a specialized CPU perform the 802.11 processing;
- the chip vendor has tighter control of the MLME.

A popular example of FullMAC chips is the one implemented on the Raspberry Pi 3.

The Linux kernel's mac80211 framework provides capabilities for SoftMAC devices and additional capabilities (such as mesh networking, which is known as the IEEE 802.11s standard) for devices with limited functionality.

FreeBSD also supports SoftMAC drivers.

== See also ==
- List of device bandwidths
- Wi-Fi operating system support
