= IEEE Registration Authority =

The IEEE Registration Authority is the administrative body that is responsible for registering and administering organizationally unique identifiers (OUI) and other types of identifiers which are used in the computer and electronics industries (Individual Address Blocks (IAB), Manufacturer IDs, Standard Group MAC Addresses, Unique Registration Numbers (URN), EtherType values, etc.)

The IEEE Registration Authority was formed in 1986 in response to a need for this service that was recognized by the P802 (LAN/MAN) standards group. The IEEE Registration Authority is currently recognized by ISO/IEC as the authorized registration authority to provide the service of globally assigning, administering, and registering OUIs.

Note: The term 'Registration' as used in this context is "the assignment of unambiguous names to objects in a way which makes the assignment available to interested parties".
