= VnStat =

Open source network traffic monitor

vnStat
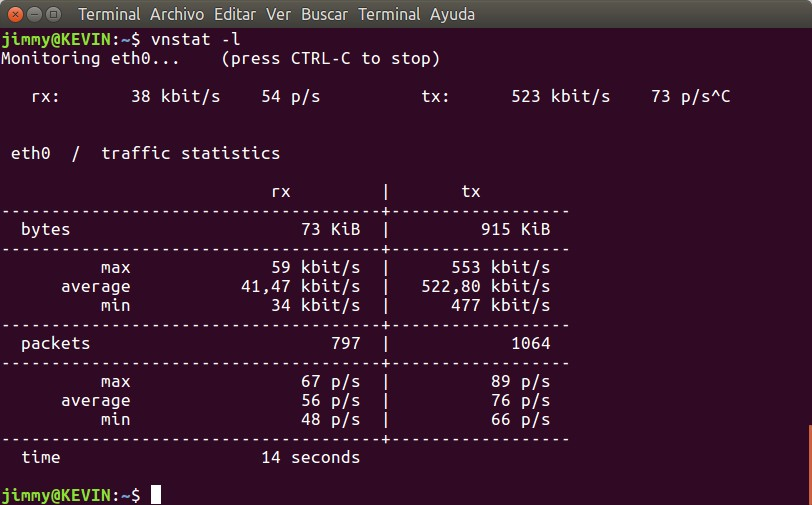
- vnStat 1.14 (GitHub version)
- Original author: Teemu Toivola
- Release: 23 September 2002; 24 years ago
- Stable release: 2.13 / 8 February 2025; 21 months ago
- Written in: C
- Operating system: Linux, FreeBSD, OpenBSD, macOS
- Available in: English
- Type: Network utility
- License: GNU General Public License
- Website: humdi.net/vnstat/
- Repository: github.com/vergoh/vnstat

vnStat is an open source network utility for Linux and BSD. It uses a command line interface. vnStat command is a console-based network traffic monitor. It keeps a log of hourly, daily and monthly network traffic for the selected interface(s) but is not a packet sniffer. The traffic information is analyzed from interfaces statistics provided by the kernel. That way vnStat can be used even without root permissions.

== History ==
vnStat is a console-based network traffic monitor that uses the network interface statistics provided by the kernel as information source. This means that vnStat won't actually be sniffing any traffic and also ensures light use of system resources. vnStat had an Initial public release in 23-Sep-2002 (version 1.0) by Teemu Toivola.

On 8 March 2004 its webpage moved to https://humdi.net/vnstat/ and a man page was included.

On 4 November 2006 was included in Debian for Testing Watch and on 17 November 2006 was removed and next day was accepted 1.4-4 version. On 20 February 2010 was accepted 1.10-0.1 version in Debian. Nowadays Debian keeps a full history about vnstat by using a Rich Site Summary.

On 25 October 2010 was included in the OpenBSD ports tree.

On 26 April 2012 was included in Ubuntu 12.04 Precise Pangolin

On 16 February 2017 a 1.17 version was released.
