= NetworkManager =

Linux network interface manager

- Original author: Red Hat
- Release: November 19, 2004; 21 years ago
- Stable release: 1.58.1 / 21 August 2026; 2 months ago
- Written in: C with GObject
- Operating system: Linux
- Type: Network interface configuration daemon and utility; Linux on the desktop
- License: GNU LGPL v2.1 or later, portions GNU GPL v2 or later
- Website: networkmanager.dev
- Repository: gitlab.freedesktop.org/NetworkManager/NetworkManager.git

NetworkManager is a daemon that sits on top of libudev and other Linux kernel interfaces (and a couple of other daemons) and provides a high-level interface for the configuration of the network interfaces to simplify the use of computer networks on Linux distributions.

== How it works ==
NetworkManager is a system daemon, with various graphical front-ends available

Linux kernel: network device drivers and network stack. Utility programs are not depicted, they communicate through the SCI with the different components of the kernel.

To connect computers with each other, various communications protocols have been developed, e.g. IEEE 802.3 (Ethernet), IEEE 802.11 ("wireless"), IEEE 802.15.1 (Bluetooth), PPPoE, PPPoA, etc. Each participating computer must have the suitable hardware, e.g. network card or wireless network card and this hardware must be configured accordingly to be able to establish a connection.

In case of a monolithic kernel all the device drivers are part of it. The hardware is accessed (and also configured) through its device driver by the configuration utility to configure the hardware, and programs like the web browser/SSH/NTP-client/etc. to send and receive network packets.

=== Configuration of network interfaces without NetworkManager ===
On Linux and all Unix-like operating systems, the utilities ifconfig and the newer ip (from the iproute2-bundle) are used to configure IEEE 802.3 and IEEE 802.11 hardware. These utilities configure the kernel directly and the configuration is applied immediately. After boot-up, the user is required to configure them again.

To apply the same static configuration after each boot-up, the PID1-programs are used: System V init executes shell scripts and binary programs, systemd parses its own conf-files (and executes programs). The boot-up configuration for network interfaces is stored in /etc/network/interfaces for Debian Linux distributions and its derivatives or ifcfg files in /etc/sysconfig/network-scripts/ for Fedora and its derivatives, and DNS-servers in /etc/resolv.conf. /etc/network/interfaces or /etc/sysconfig/network-scripts/ifcfg-* can define a static IP-address or dhclient to be used, and all kinds of VPN can be configured here as well.

In case the configuration has to be changed, DHCP-protocol goes a long way to do so automatically, without the user even noticing.

=== Configuration of network interfaces with NetworkManager ===
- NetworkManager is accessible via D-Bus.
- Configuration is stored in /etc/NetworkManager/NetworkManager.conf

But as we've transitioned from physically large servers to more portable hosts that may be plugged and unplugged (or moved from WiFi hotspot to WiFi hotspot) at the user's discretion, dynamic configurations (i.e., not stored in a static configuration file but taken from outside the host, and potentially changing after boot) have become a more prevalent configuration. Bootp was an early protocol used for this, and to this day its descendant DHCP is still very common. Many Unix-like systems include a program called dhclient to handle this dynamic configuration. Given a relatively static or simple dynamic configuration, static configuration modified by dhclient works well. However, as networks and their topologies get more complex, a central manager for all the network configuration information becomes more essential.

==== Software architecture ====
NetworkManager has two components:

1. the NetworkManager daemon, the actual software which manages connections and reports network changes
2. the graphical or command-line interface

===== Graphical front-ends and command line interfaces =====
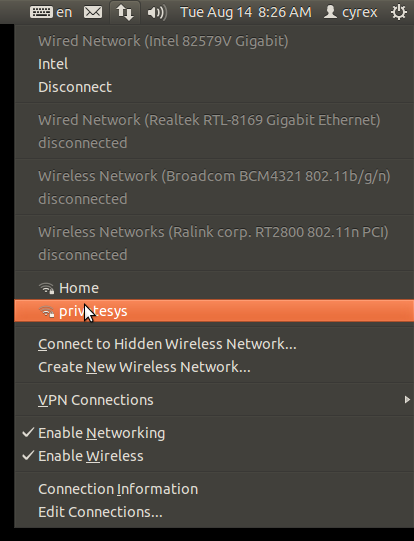
nm-applet 0.9.5 in Ubuntu 12.04's systray, showing all available APs.

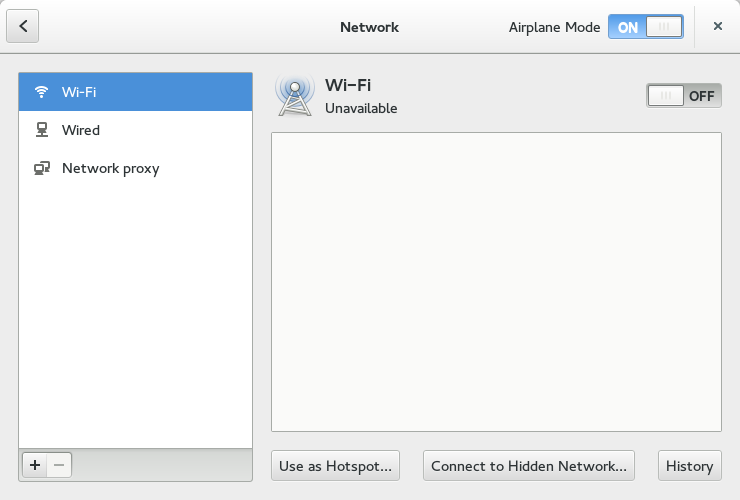
Graphical front-end for GNOME Shell 3.10.

nm‑applet
nm‑applet is a GTK 3-based GUI for NetworkManager which runs in the system tray. The applet is maintained by the GNOME project, and can be used with any desktop environment which implements the fd.o System Tray Protocol (this excludes the GNOME Shell, which has its own built-in implementation).
plasma‑nm
KDE Plasma 6 has its own applet for configuring connections through NetworkManager, plasma‑nm. The applet is not included in Plasma 6 by default.
nmcli
nmcli is NetworkManager's built-in command-line interface added in 2010. nmcli allows easy display of NetworkManager's current status, manage connections and devices, monitor connections.
nmtui
nmtui is the built-in text-based user interface for NetworkManager. It is basic when compared to nmcli, as it only allows users to add, edit, activate and deactivate connections; set the hostname of the system; and enable and disable radios. It does not allow for the setup of wired connections, WPA-Enterprise, or VPNs; preconfigured connections can be used.
cnetworkmanager
cnetworkmanager is a Python-based CLI for NetworkManager, written by Martin Vidner. The project's last commit was in August 2010; its final version (0.21.1) was released in August 2009.

=== Mobile broadband support ===
NetworkManager is used in conjunction with ModemManager and Paul's PPP Package for WWAN/mobile broadband support.

Antti Kaijanmäki announced the development of a mobile broadband configuration assistant for NetworkManager in April 2008; the required changes were made to NetworkManager in 0.7.1.

== History ==
Red Hat initiated the NetworkManager project in 2004 with the goal of enabling Linux users to deal more easily with modern networking needs, particularly wireless networking. NetworkManager takes an opportunistic approach to network selection, attempting to use the best available connection as outages occur, or as the user roams between wireless networks. It prefers Ethernet connections over “known” wireless networks, which are preferred over wireless networks with SSIDs to which the user has never connected. The user is prompted for WEP or WPA keys as needed.

The NetworkManager project was among the first major Linux desktop components to utilize D-Bus and HAL extensively. Since June 2009, however, NetworkManager no longer depends on HAL, and since 0.9.10 (ca. 2014), neither does it require the D-Bus daemon to be running for root operation.

== See also ==
- Linux on the desktop – Overview of Linux's uses
- BlueZ – System software implementing Bluetooth functions
- GNOME Keyring Manager – Linux password management software
- usbserial – Unix software library
- Wicd – network manager written in Python
- wpa_supplicant – Open-source implementation of IEEE 802.11i
- wvdial – Computer program for assisting modem connections
- netifd – tiny daemon with the ability to listen on netlink events; does not require D-Bus, does not depend on GLib, targets embedded devices
- ConnMan – daemon for managing Internet connections within embedded devices
