= Netsh =

Command-line utility

netsh
- Developer: Microsoft
- Initial release: October 25, 2001; 24 years ago
- Operating system: Microsoft Windows
- Type: Command
- License: Proprietary commercial software
- Website: docs.microsoft.com/en-us/windows-server/networking/technologies/netsh/netsh

In computing, netsh, or network shell, is a command-line utility included in Microsoft's Windows NT line of operating systems. This command was officially launched with the release of Windows XP in 2001, although netsh did first appear on Windows 2000 in 1999. It allows local or remote configuration of network devices such as the interface.

== Overview ==
A common use of netsh is to reset the TCP/IP stack to default, known-good parameters, a task that in Windows 98 required reinstallation of the TCP/IP adapter.

netsh, among many other things, also allows the user to change the IP address on their machine.

Starting from Windows Vista, one can also edit wireless settings (for example, SSID) using netsh.

netsh can also be used to read information from the IPv6 stack.

The command netsh winsock reset can be used to reset TCP/IP problems when communicating with a networked device.
