= Route (command) =

Computer operating system command

route
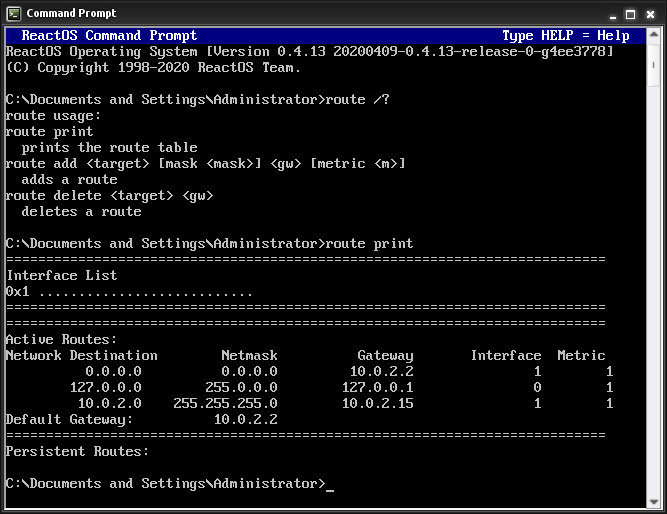
- The ReactOS route command
- Developers: Fred N. van Kempen, Microsoft, IBM, ReactOS Contributors
- Operating system: Unix-like, OS/2, Microsoft Windows, ReactOS
- Platform: Cross-platform
- Type: Command
- License: OS/2, Windows: Proprietary commercial software ReactOS: GPLv2

In computing, route is a command used to view and manipulate the IP routing table in Unix-like and Microsoft Windows operating systems and also in IBM OS/2 and ReactOS. Manual manipulation of the routing table is characteristic of static routing.

== Implementations ==
=== Unix and Unix-like ===
The route command originated in 4.2BSD. It is not part of any UNIX standard, but the BSD interface is widely implemented.

Linux contains a version of the route originally written by Fred N. van Kempen, later merged with netstat's codebase (another command originating in 4.2BSD). It implements an extended syntax compared to the BSD version. In Linux distributions based on 2.2.x Linux kernels, the ifconfig and route commands are operated together to connect a computer to a network, and to define routes between computer networks. Distributions based on later kernels have deprecated ifconfig and route, replacing them with iproute2.

On macOS, the route utility is present but largely nonfunctional. Displaying the routing table is instead performed via netstat -nr.

==== Syntax ====
The BSD syntax is:

route [-dnqtv] {add|del|flush|get|monitor} [[modifiers] args]

The Linux syntax is:

route [-nNvee] [-FC] [<AF>]           # List kernel routing tables
route [-v] [-FC] {add|del|flush} ...  # Modify routing table for AF.
route {-h|--help} [<AF>]              # Detailed usage syntax for specified AF.
route {-V|--version}                  # Display version/author and exit.

In other words, the basic route add and route del commands are portable.

==== Example ====
user@linux:~$ route -n
Kernel IP routing table
Destination     Gateway         Genmask         Flags Metric Ref    Use Iface
192.168.101.0   192.168.102.102 255.255.255.0   UG    0      0        0 eth0
192.168.102.0   0.0.0.0         255.255.255.0   U     0      0        0 eth0
192.168.103.0   192.168.102.102 255.255.255.0   UG    0      0        0 eth0
192.168.12.0    0.0.0.0         255.255.255.0   U     0      0        0 eth0
0.0.0.0         192.168.12.1    0.0.0.0         UG    0      0        0 eth0

=== Microsoft Windows ===
The command is only available if the TCP/IP protocol is installed as a component in the properties of a network adapter.

==== Syntax ====
The command-syntax is:

route [-f] [-p] [-4|-6] [Command [Destination] [mask Netmask] [Gateway] [[metric Metric]] [[if Interface]]

==== Parameters ====
- -f: Clears the routing table
- -p: The route is added to the Windows Registry and is used to initialize the IP routing table whenever the TCP/IP protocol is started (only when used with the add command)
- Command: The command to run (add, change, delete, print)
- -4: Force using IPv4
- -6: Force using IPv6
- Destination: Network destination of the route
- mask Netmask: The netmask (subnet mask) associated with the network destination
- Gateway: The forwarding or next hop IP address over which the set of addresses defined by the network destination and subnet mask are reachable
- metric Metric: Integer cost metric (ranging from 1 to 9999) for the route
- if Interface: The index of the interface over which the destination is reachable
- /?: Command help

The -p parameter is only supported on Windows NT 4.0, Windows 2000, Windows Millennium Edition, and Windows XP. It is not supported on Windows 95 or Windows 98.

=== IBM OS/2 ===
==== Syntax ====
The command-syntax is:

route [-nqv] [COMMAND] [[MODIFIERS] args]

==== Parameters ====
- -n: Bypasses translating IP addresses to symbolic host names
- -q: Suppresses all output
- -v: Verbose
- COMMAND: The command to run (add, delete, change, get, monitor, flush)
- -net: <dest> is a network address
- -host: <dest> is host name or address (default)
- -netmask: the mask of the route
- <dest>: IP address or host name of the destination
- <gateway>: IP address or host name of the next-hop router

=== ReactOS ===
ReactOS is an open-source Windows clone. The route implementation will eventually cover all options supported by Windows, but the current (as of 2025) version does not. It instead implements a subset of the options, a "poor man's route":

==== Syntax ====
Print the route table:

route print

Add a route:

route add <target> [mask <mask>] <gw> [metric <m>]

Delete a route:

route delete <target> <gw>

== See also ==
- Routing table
- Internet Protocol Suite
- iproute2
- BusyBox
