= Netstat =

Command line network statistics tool

netstat
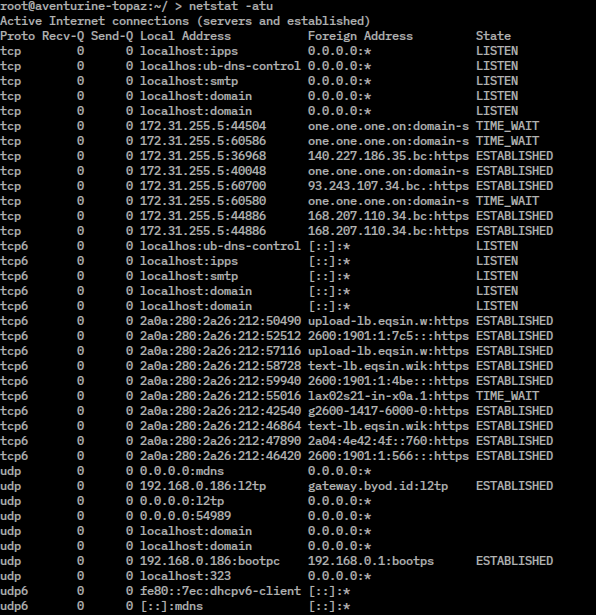
- The netstat command in Linux
- Developer(s): Various open-source and commercial developers
- Initial release: 1983; 42 years ago
- Written in: Plan 9: C
- Operating system: Unix, Unix-like, Plan 9, Inferno, OS/2, Microsoft Windows, ReactOS
- Platform: Cross-platform
- Type: Command
- License: OS/2, Windows: Proprietary commercial software net-tools, ReactOS: GPLv2; Plan 9: MIT License

In computing, netstat is a command-line network utility that displays open network sockets, routing tables, and a number of network interface (network interface controller or software-defined network interface) and network protocol statistics. It is available on Unix, Plan 9, Inferno, and Unix-like operating systems including macOS, Linux, Solaris and BSD. It is also available on IBM OS/2 and on Microsoft Windows NT-based operating systems including Windows XP, Windows Vista, Windows 7, Windows 8 and Windows 10.

It is used for finding problems in the network and to determine the amount of traffic on the network as a performance measurement. On Linux this program is mostly obsolete, although still included in many distributions.

On Linux, netstat (part of "net-tools") is superseded by ss (part of iproute2). The replacement for netstat -r is ip route, the replacement for netstat -i is ip -s link, and the replacement for netstat -g is ip maddr, all of which are recommended instead.

== Statistics provided ==
Netstat provides statistics for the following:

- Proto – The name of the protocol (TCP, UDP, etc.). On some systems, the protocol name may be followed by "4" or "6", depending on whether the protocol is running over IPv4 or IPv6.
- Local Address – The IP address of the local computer and the port number being used. The name of the local computer that corresponds to the IP address and the name of the port is shown unless the -n parameter is specified. An asterisk (*) is shown for the host if the server is listening on all interfaces. If the port is not yet established, the port number is shown as an asterisk.
- Foreign Address – The IP address and port number of the remote computer to which the socket is connected. The names that corresponds to the IP address and the port are shown unless the -n parameter is specified. If the port is not yet established, the port number is shown as an asterisk (*).
- State – Indicates the state of a TCP connection. The possible states are as follows: CLOSE_WAIT, CLOSED, ESTABLISHED, FIN_WAIT_1, FIN_WAIT_2, LAST_ACK, LISTEN, SYN_RECEIVED, SYN_SEND, and TIME_WAIT. For more information about the states of a TCP connection, see RFC 793.

== Parameters ==
Parameters used with this command must be prefixed with a hyphen (-) rather than a slash (/). Some parameters are not supported on all platforms.

Name	Description	Windows	ReactOS	macOS	BSD	NetBSD	FreeBSD	Linux	Solaris	OS/2
-a	Displays all active connections and the TCP and UDP ports on which the computer is listening.	Yes		Yes	Yes	Yes	Yes	Yes		
-b	Displays the binary (executable) program's name involved in creating each connection or listening port. (Windows XP, Windows Server 2003 and newer Windows operating systems; not Microsoft Windows 2000 or older).	Yes	No							No
-b	Causes -i to report the total number of bytes of traffic.		No	Yes		Yes				No
-e	Displays ethernet statistics, such as the number of bytes and packets sent and received. This parameter can be combined with -s.	Yes	Yes							No
-f	Displays fully qualified domain names <FQDN> for foreign addresses (only available on Windows Vista and newer operating systems).	Yes	No							No
-f Address Family	Limits display to a particular socket address family, unix, inet, inet6		No				Yes			No
-g	Displays multicast group membership information for both IPv4 and IPv6 (may only be available on newer operating systems)	No	No					Yes		
-i	Displays network interfaces and their statistics	No	No	Yes	Yes	Yes	Yes	Yes		
-m	Displays the memory statistics for the networking code (STREAMS statistics on Solaris).	No	No	Yes	Yes	Yes	Yes		Yes	
-n	Displays active TCP connections, however, addresses and port numbers are expressed numerically and no attempt is made to determine names.	Yes	Yes	Yes	Yes	Yes	Yes	Yes	Yes	
-o	Displays active TCP connections and includes the process id (PID) for each connection. You can find the application based on the PID in the Processes tab in Windows Task Manager. This parameter can be combined with -a, -n, and -p. This parameter is available on Microsoft Windows XP, Windows Server 2003, and Windows 2000 if a hotfix is applied.	Yes	No							No
-p protocol	Shows connections for the protocol specified by protocol. In this case, protocol can be tcp, udp, tcpv6, or udpv6. If this parameter is used with -s to display statistics by protocol, protocol can be tcp, udp, icmp, ip, tcpv6, udpv6, icmpv6, or ipv6.	Yes	Yes	Yes	Yes	Yes	Yes			
-p	Show which processes are using which sockets (similar to -b under Windows) (you must be root to do this)	No	No					Yes		
-P protocol	Shows connections for the protocol specified by protocol. In this case, protocol can be ip, ipv6, icmp, icmpv6, igmp, udp, tcp, or rawip.	No	No						Yes	
-r	Displays the contents of the IP routing table. (This is equivalent to the route print command under Windows.)	Yes	Yes	Yes	Yes	Yes	Yes	Yes	Yes	Yes
-s	Displays statistics by protocol. By default, statistics are shown for the TCP, UDP, ICMP, and IP protocols. If the IPv6 protocol for Windows XP is installed, statistics are shown for the TCP over IPv6, UDP over IPv6, ICMPv6, and IPv6 protocols. The -p parameter can be used to specify a set of protocols.	Yes	Yes	Yes	Yes	Yes	Yes	Yes	Yes	
-t	Display only TCP connections.		No					Yes		Yes
-u	Display only UDP connections.	No	No					Yes		Yes
-W	Display wide output - doesn't truncate hostnames or IPv6 addresses	No	No				Yes			No
-x	Displays NetworkDirect connections, listeners, and shared endpoints.	Yes								
-y	Displays the TCP connection template for all connections.Cannot be combined with the other options.	Yes								
-v	When used in conjunction with -b it will display the sequence of components involved in creating the connection or listening port for all executables.	Yes	No							No
Interval	Redisplays the selected information every Interval seconds. Press CTRL+C to stop the redisplay. If this parameter is omitted, netstat prints the selected information only once.	Yes	Yes							No
-h	Displays help at the command prompt.	Yes	No	Yes	Yes	Yes	Yes	Yes	Yes	No
-?	Displays help at the command prompt.	Yes	No	No	No	No	No	No	No	Yes
/?	Displays help at the command prompt.	Yes	Yes	No	No	No	No	No	No	No

== Examples ==
=== Cross platform ===
On macOS, BSD systems, Linux distributions, and Microsoft Windows:

To display the statistics for only the TCP or UDP protocols, type one of the following commands:

netstat -sp tcp

netstat -sp udp

=== Unix-like ===
On Unix-like systems:

To display all ports open by a process with id pid:

netstat -aop | grep "pid"

To continuously display open TCP and UDP connections numerically and also which program is using them on Linux:

netstat -nutpacw

=== Windows ===
On Microsoft Windows:

To display active TCP connections and the process IDs every 5 seconds, type the following command (works on NT based systems only, or Windows 2000 with hotfix):

netstat -o 5

To display active TCP connections and the process IDs using numerical form, type the following command (works on NT based systems only, or Windows 2000 with hotfix):

netstat -no

=== *nix ===
Command	Explanation
netstat -a	Shows all sockets, both listening and non-listening, all protocols like TCP, UDP etc.
netstat -at	Shows only TCP connections (-au shows only UDP connections)
netstat -ant	Shows all TCP connections with no DNS resolution (show IP addresses instead).
netstat -al	Shows only listening sockets.
netstat -aep	Also show PID and to which program each socket belongs, e adds extra info like the user. Run as root to see all PIDs.
netstat -s	Shows network statistics.
netstat -r	Shows kernel routing information. This is the same output as route -e.
netstat -i	Displays a table of all network interfaces. Add -e to get output similar to ifconfig.
netstat -ct	Displays TCP connections continuously.
netstat -g	Display multicast group membership information for IPv4 and IPv6.
netstat -lntu	Display all services listening for TCP and UDP, all free open ports on the local machine.
netstat -atnp | grep ESTA	Displays all currently "established" TCP connections.

=== Wildcards ===
Netstat uses an asterisk * as a wildcard which means "any". An example would be

Example output:

....Local Address Foreign Address State
... *:smtp          *:*   LISTEN

Under "Local Address" *, in *:smtp, means the process is listening on all of the network interfaces the machine has for the port mapped as smtp (see /etc/services for service resolution). This can also be shown as 0.0.0.0. The first *, in *:*, means connections can come from any IP address, and the second *, in *:*, means the connection can originate from any port on the remote machine.

== Caveats ==
Some versions of netstat lack explicit field delimiters in their printf-generated output, leading to numeric fields running together and thus corrupting the output data.

== Platform specific remarks ==
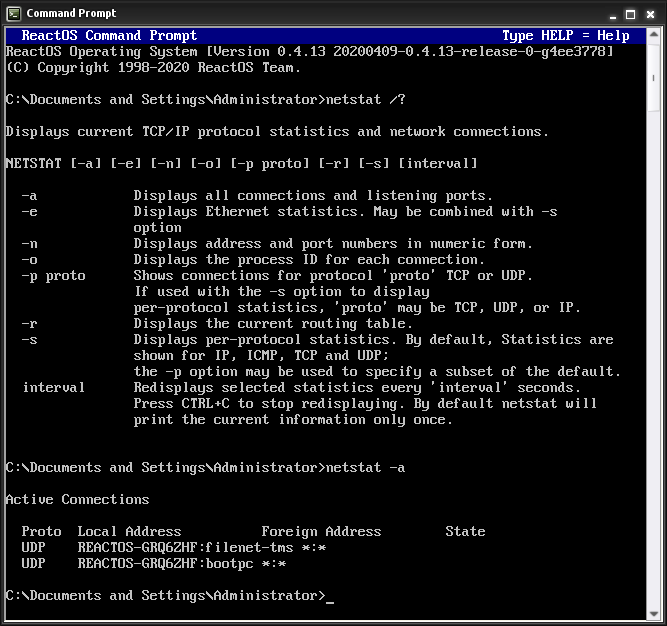
The ReactOS netstat command

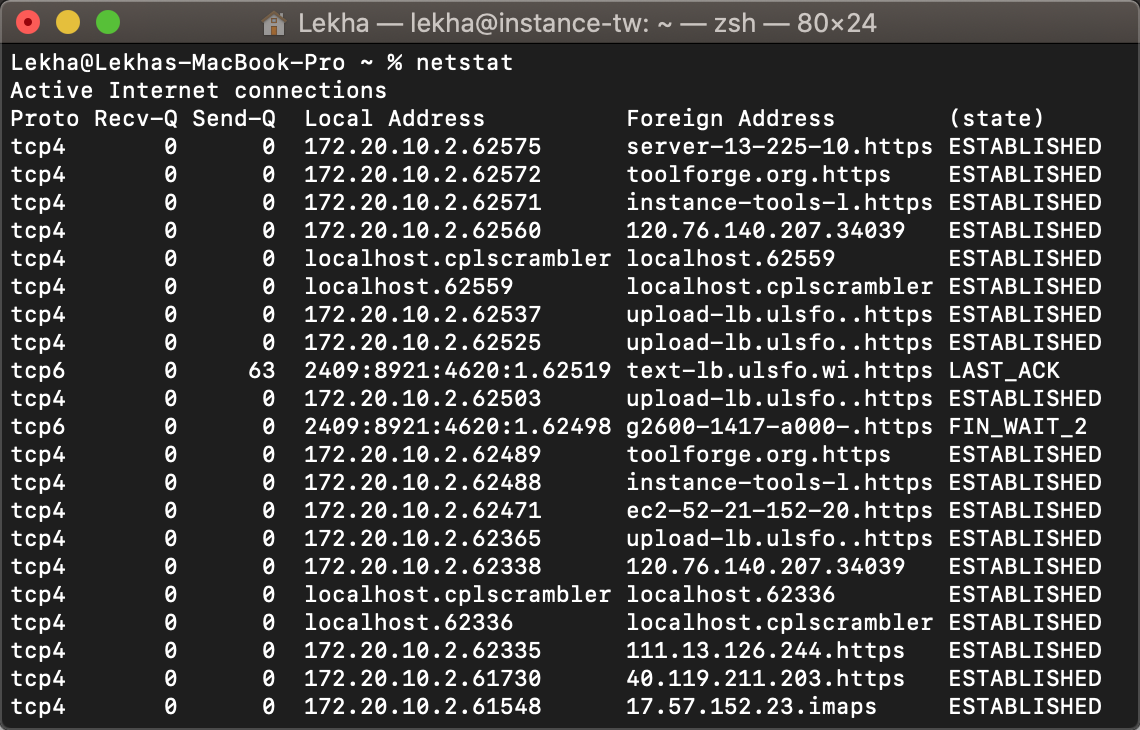
The macOS netstat command

Under Linux, raw data can often be obtained from the /proc/net/dev to work around the printf output corruption arising in netstat's network interface statistics summary, netstat -i, until such time as the problem is corrected.

On the Windows platform, netstat information can be retrieved by calling the GetTcpTable and GetUdpTable functions in the IP Helper API, or IPHLPAPI.DLL. Information returned includes local and remote IP addresses, local and remote ports, and (for GetTcpTable) TCP status codes. In addition to the command-line netstat.exe tool that ships with Windows, GUI-based netstat programs are available.

On the Windows platform, this command is available only if the Internet Protocol (TCP/IP) protocol is installed as a component in the properties of a network adapter in Network Connections.

On the Windows platform running Remote Desktop Services (formerly Terminal Services) it will only show connections for the current user, not for the whole computer.

On macOS, the /System/Library/CoreServices/Applications folder (or /Applications/Utilities in OS X Mountain Lion and earlier) contains a network GUI utility called Network Utility, the Netstat tab of which runs the netstat command and displays its output in the tab.

== See also ==
- ss, a Linux utility to investigate sockets from iproute2 meant to replace netstat
- lsof -i
- bmon
