= Wicd =

Networking application for Linux

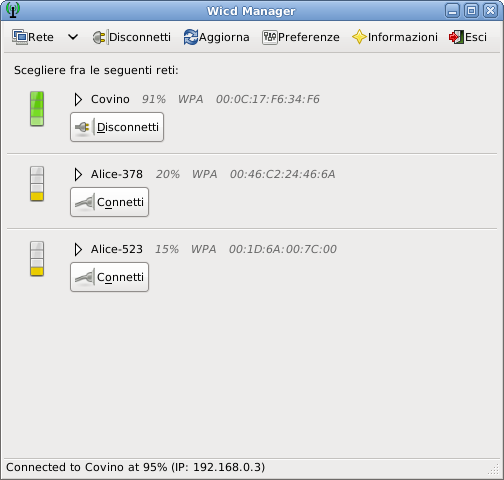
- Italian version of Wicd on a Linux-like operating system
- Developers: Adam Blackburn, Dan O'Reilly, Andrew Psaltis, David Paleino
- Stable release: 1.7.4 / January 25, 2016; 10 years ago
- Written in: Python
- Operating system: Linux
- Type: Network management; Linux on the desktop
- License: GPL (free software)
- Website: launchpad.net/wicd
- Repository: code.launchpad.net/wicd

Wicd, which stands for Wireless Interface Connection Daemon, is an open-source software utility to manage both wireless and wired networks for Linux. The project started in late 2006 with the creation of Connection Manager, which eventually became Wicd. Wicd aims to provide a simple interface to connect to networks with a wide variety of settings.

Wicd will only automatically connect to wireless networks you have specified and will not automatically connect to an unknown network.

Wicd supports wireless encryption using wpa_supplicant. Users can design their own "templates", which can be used by Wicd to connect to a large variety of networks using any type of encryption wpa_supplicant supports.

Wicd is split into two major components: the daemon, and the user interface. These two components communicate via D-Bus. This design allows the user interface to run as a standard user, and the daemon to run as the root user, so the user can change the wireless network without knowing the root password. The split interface/daemon design would also allow a person to write a new front-end to the Wicd daemon, such as wicd-qt. There are also other front-ends available for many DEs such as GNOME, Xfce, and Fluxbox.

Wicd is currently available in some Linux distributions, such as Ubuntu and Zenwalk Linux. Debian has dropped support for it because Python 2 is no longer supported. Gentoo Linux and Slackware also dropped support for it.

== See also ==
- NetworkManager
- Wireless tools for Linux, for command-line interface
- netifd, net interface daemon of the OpenWrt project
- Linux on the desktop
