= Utility software =

Software that supports computer infrastructure

Utility software is software that supports managing the computer infrastructure including computer hardware, system software and application software. Utility software provides for performing tasks as a system administrator (that is, as a user acting in that role). In contrast, application software provides for performing tasks as an end user.

A utility may be a distinct program, or multiple utilities are implemented in a single program. For example, BusyBox implements many utilities in a single program. Commonly, a utility provides a command-line interface, but some provide a graphical user interface.

Although an operating system (OS) installation usually includes utilities (which are considered part of the OS), users often install additional utilities. The additional utilities may provide a better user experience or additional functionality.

Often, a user must be authorized for elevated privileges to use a utility since it may affect other users of the system.

== Taxonomy ==
This section is a taxonomy of kinds of utilities.

=== System management ===
Antivirus
Protects the host system from computer viruses.
Clipboard manager
Expands clipboard functionality.
Computer access control
Grants or denies requests for access to system resources.
Debugger
Provides for programming-level control of program execution including the examination and modification of program data.
Diagnostic
Determines and reports the operational status of computer hardware and software. For example, a memory tester.
Network
Analyzes the host system's network connectivity, configures network settings, reports data transfer and log events.
Package manager
Configures, installs and updates software on the host system.
Registry cleaner
Removes registry keys that are no longer in use from the Windows Registry. Microsoft does not support the use of registry cleaners.
System monitor
Monitors resources and performance of the host system.
System profiler
Reports information about installed software and hardware.

=== Storage device management ===
Backup
Copies data from a storage device for the purpose of recovering from data loss due to events such as disk failure, file corruption or accidental deletion.
Disk checker
Checks a disk for problems.
Disk cloning
Duplicates the content of a disk.
Disk compression
Transparently compress/uncompress the content of a disk, increasing the capacity of the disk.
Disk defragmenter
Reorganizes the data of each file so that it is stored contiguously.
Disk formatter
Writes to a disk so that it can be used for a particular format. Can prepare a disk for initial use or erase the entire disk.
Disk partitioner
Divides an disk into multiple logical drives, each with its own file system which can be mounted by the operating system.
Disk space analyzer
Visualizes disk space use for each file and directory.
Tape initializer
Writes a label to a magnetic tape or other magnetic medium.
Undelete
Supports recovering files that were deleted.

=== File management ===
Archiver
Outputs a stream or a single file when provided with a directory or a set of files. Archive suites may include compression and encryption capabilities. Some archive utilities have a separate un-archive utility for the reverse operation. One nearly universal type of archive file format is the zip file.
Cryptographic
Encrypts and decrypts streams and files.
Data compression
Outputs a shorter stream or a smaller file when provided with a stream or file.
Data conversion
Transforms data from a source file to some other format, such as from a text file to a PDF document.
Data recovery
Recovers data from corrupted files.
Data synchronization
Establishes consistency among data from a source to a target data storage and vice versa.
Disk cleaner
Deletes files that are unnecessary to computer operation, or take up considerable amounts of space.
File comparison
Reports differences between files.
File manager
Provides an interface for performing file management tasks such as deleting, renaming, cataloging, moving, copying, merging, setting file access, creating and modifying directories.
File synchronization
Maintains consistency between two storages for various purposes including redundancy and backup.
Revision control
Manages revisions of files.

=== Miscellaneous ===
Data generator
Creates a file of test data according to specified patterns. For example, IEBDG.
Hex editor
Allows for editing the data of a file without regard its format.
HTML checker
Validates HTML code and checks links.
Installation or setup
Initializes or configures programs, usually applications programs, for use in a specific computer environment. An uninstaller does the opposite.
Macro recorder
Permits use of keyboard macros in programs that do not natively support such a feature.
Patching
Modifies files, especially object programs when program source is unavailable.
Screensaver
Controls the host monitor with the intention of preventing phosphor burn-in on CRT and plasma monitors.
Sort/Merge program
Arranges records (usually lines) of a file into a specified sequence.

== See also ==
- Batch file
- kdeutils
- List of DOS commands
- List of macOS built-in apps
- List of POSIX commands
- Shell script
- Support programs for OS/360 and successors
- System software
