= Ipconfig =

Console application program

ipconfig
- Screenshot of ipconfig /all output in Windows XP
- Developers: Microsoft, ReactOS Contributors, Apple Inc.
- Written in: C
- Operating system: Windows, ReactOS, macOS
- Platform: Cross-platform
- Type: Command
- License: Windows, macOS: Proprietary commercial software ReactOS: GPL-2.0-or-later

ipconfig (standing for "Internet Protocol configuration") is a console application program of some computer operating systems that displays all current TCP/IP network configuration values and refreshes Dynamic Host Configuration Protocol (DHCP) and Domain Name System (DNS) settings.

== Implementations ==
The command is available in Microsoft Windows, ReactOS, and in Apple macOS. The ReactOS version was developed by Ged Murphy and is licensed under the GPL.

=== Microsoft Windows, ReactOS ===
The ipconfig command supports the command-line switch /all. This results in more detailed information than ipconfig alone.

An important additional feature of ipconfig is to force refreshing of the DHCP IP address of the host computer to request a different IP address. This is done using two commands in sequence. First, ipconfig /release is executed to force the client to immediately give up its lease by sending the server a DHCP release notification which updates the server's status information and marks the old client's IP address as "available". Then, the command ipconfig /renew is executed to request a new IP address. Where a computer is connected to a cable or DSL modem, it may have to be plugged directly into the modem network port to bypass the router, before using ipconfig /release and turning off the power for a period of time, to ensure that the old IP address is taken by another computer.

The /flushdns parameter can be used to clear the Domain Name System (DNS) cache to ensure future requests use fresh DNS information by forcing hostnames to be resolved again from scratch.)

=== Apple macOS ===
ipconfig in Mac OS X serves as a wrapper to the IPConfiguration agent, and can be used to control the Bootstrap Protocol and DHCP client from the command-line interface. For example, you can release and renew an IP address if it happened to be assigned incorrectly by the DHCP server during the automated assignment process. Like most Unix-based operating systems, Mac OS X also uses ifconfig for more direct control over network interfaces, such as configuring static IP addresses.

== See also ==
- ifconfig
