= Iproute2 =

Suite of computer networking utilities

iproute2
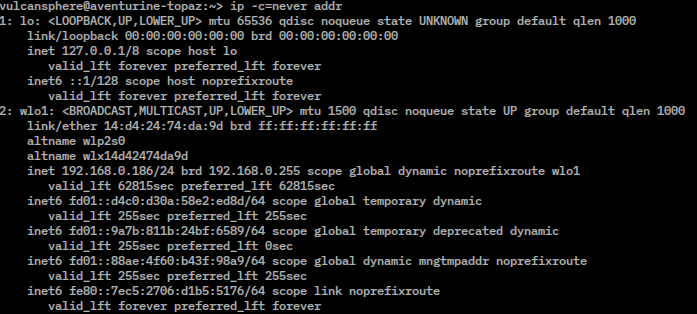
- Screenshot of ip addr in Linux
- Original author: Alexey Kuznetsov
- Developer: Stephen Hemminger
- Stable release: 7.0.0 / 15 April 2026; 39 days ago
- Written in: C
- Operating system: Linux
- Type: Networking
- License: GPLv2
- Website: wiki.linuxfoundation.org/networking/iproute2
- Repository: git.kernel.org/pub/scm/network/iproute2/iproute2.git

iproute2 is a collection of userspace utilities for controlling and monitoring various aspects of networking in the Linux kernel, including routing, network interfaces, tunnels, traffic control, and network-related device drivers.

== Project ==
iproute2 is an open-source project released under the terms of version 2 of the GNU General Public License. Its development is closely tied to the development of networking components of the Linux kernel. As of December 2013, iproute2 is maintained by Stephen Hemminger and David Ahern. The original author, Alexey Kuznetsov, was responsible for the quality of service (QoS) implementation in the Linux kernel.

iproute2 collection contains the following command-line utilities: arpd, bridge, ctstat, dcb, devlink, ip, lnstat, nstat, rdma, routef, routel, rtacct, rtmon, rtstat, ss, tc, tipc and vdpa. tc is used for traffic control. iproute2 utilities communicate with the Linux kernel using the netlink protocol. Some of the iproute2 utilities are often recommended over now-obsolete net-tools utilities that provide the same functionality. Below is a table of obsolete utilities and their iproute2 replacements.

Utilities obsoleted by iproute2
Legacy utility	Replacement command	Note
ifconfig	ip addr, ip link	Address and link configuration
route	ip route	Routing tables
arp	ip neigh	Neighbors
iptunnel	ip tunnel	Tunnels
nameif, ifrename	ip link set name	Rename network interfaces
ipmaddr	ip maddr	Multicast
netstat	ss, ip route	Show various networking statistics
brctl	bridge	Handle bridge addresses and devices

== See also ==
- BusyBox
- ethtool
- TIPC
