= Service set (802.11 network) =

Group of all devices on the same wireless network

An example of a service set called "WiFi Wikipedia" consisting of two basic service sets (BSSs). Notebook_My is able to automatically roam between the two BSSs, without the user having to explicitly connect to the second network since the service set identifier (SSID) is the same.

In IEEE 802.11 wireless local area networking standards (including Wi‑Fi), a service set is a group of wireless network devices which share a service set identifier (SSID)—typically the natural language label that users see as a network name. (For example, all of the devices that together form and use a Wi‑Fi network called "Foo" are a service set.) A service set forms a logical network of nodes operating with shared link-layer networking parameters; they form one logical network segment.

A service set is either a basic service set (BSS) or an extended service set (ESS).

A basic service set is a subgroup, within a service set, of devices that share physical-layer medium access characteristics (e.g. radio frequency, modulation scheme, security settings) such that they are wirelessly networked. The basic service set is defined by a basic service set identifier (BSSID) shared by all devices within it. The BSSID is a 48-bit label that conforms to MAC-48 conventions. While a device may have multiple BSSIDs, usually each BSSID is associated with at most one basic service set at a time.

A basic service set should not be confused with the coverage area of an access point, known as the basic service area (BSA).

== Basic service set types ==
=== Infrastructure ===
An infrastructure BSS is created by an infrastructure device called an access point (AP) for other devices to join. (Note that the term IBSS is not used for this type of BSS but refers to the independent type discussed below.) The operating parameters of the infrastructure BSS are defined by the AP. The Wi‑Fi segments of common home and business networks are examples of this type.

Each basic service set has a unique identifier, a BSSID, which is a 48-bit number that follows MAC address conventions. An infrastructure BSSID is usually non-configurable, in which case it is either preset during manufacture or mathematically derived from a preset value such as a serial number or a MAC address of another network interface. As with the MAC addresses used for Ethernet devices, an infrastructure BSSID is a combination of a 24-bit organizationally unique identifier (OUI, the manufacturer's identity) and a 24-bit serial number. A BSSID with a value of all 1s is used to indicate the wildcard BSSID, usable only during probe requests or for communications that take place outside the context of a BSS.

=== Independent ===
An independent BSS (IBSS), or ad hoc network, is created by peer devices among themselves without network infrastructure. A temporary network created by a cellular telephone to share its Internet access with other devices is a common example. In contrast to the stations in an infrastructure-mode network, the stations in a wireless ad hoc network communicate directly with one another, i.e. without a dependence on a distribution point to relay traffic between them. In this form of peer-to-peer wireless networking, the peers form an independent basic service set (IBSS). Some of the responsibilities of a distribution point—such as defining network parameters and other "beaconing" functions—are established by the first station in an ad-hoc network. However, that station does not relay traffic between the other stations; instead, the peers communicate directly with one another. Like an infrastructure BSS, an independent BSS also has a 48-bit MAC-address-like identifier. But unlike infrastructure BSS identifiers, independent BSS identifiers are not necessarily unique: the individual/group bit of the address is always set to 0 (individual), the universal/local bit of the address is always set to 1 (local), and the remaining 46 bits are randomly generated.

=== Mesh ===
A mesh basic service set (MBSS) is a self-contained network of mesh stations that share a mesh profile, defined in 802.11s. Each node may also be an access point hosting its own basic service set, for example using the mesh BSS to provide Internet access for local users. In such a system, the BSS created by the access point is distinct from the mesh network, and a wireless client of that BSS is not part of the MBSS. The formation of the mesh BSS, as well as wireless traffic management (including path selection and forwarding) is negotiated between the nodes of the mesh infrastructure. The mesh BSS is distinct from the networks (which may also be wireless) used by a mesh's redistribution points to communicate with one another.

== Service set identifier ==
The service set identifier (SSID) defines or extends a service set. Normally it is broadcast in the clear by stations in beacon packets to announce the presence of a network and seen by users as a wireless network name.

Unlike basic service set identifiers, SSIDs are usually customizable. These SSIDs can be zero to 32 octets long, and are, for convenience, usually in a natural language, such as English. The 802.11 standards prior to the 2012 edition did not define any particular encoding or representation for SSIDs, which were expected to be treated and handled as an arbitrary sequence of 0–32 octets that are not limited to printable characters. IEEE Std 802.11-2012 defines a flag to express that the SSID is UTF-8-encoded and could contain any Unicode text. Wireless network stacks must still be prepared to handle all possible values in the SSID field.

Since the contents of an SSID field are arbitrary, the 802.11 standard permits devices to advertise the presence of a wireless network with beacon packets in which the SSID field is set to null. (Note: To associate with a wireless network, a station must know the network's SSID. This information is either obtained from beacons broadcast by an access point (in which case a client can passively infer whether it is in range of that network), or—if no base station is advertising the SSID—a station must know the SSID beforehand by other means (e.g. from a previous configuration). When a client wishes to associate with a network, it sends the SSID in a probe request. An access point replies with a probe response if the SSID in a probe request is the wildcard SSID (SSID is zero-length) or matches an SSID that the access point supports; otherwise the access point does not respond to the probe request.) A null SSID (the SSID element's length field is set to zero) is called a wildcard SSID in IEEE 802.11 standards documents, and as a no broadcast SSID or hidden SSID in the context of beacon announcements, and can be used, for example, in enterprise and mesh networks to steer a client to a particular (e.g. less utilized) access point. A station may also likewise transmit packets in which the SSID field is set to null; this prompts an associated access point to send the station a list of supported SSIDs. Once a device has associated with a basic service set, for efficiency, the SSID is not sent within packet headers; only BSSIDs are used for addressing.

Apple's location services interpret the SSID of a Wi‑Fi access point ending in _nomap as an opt-out from being included in Apple's crowdsourced location databases.

== Extended service set ==
An extended service set (ESS) is a wireless network, created by multiple access points, which appears to users as a single, seamless network, such as a network covering a home or office that is too large for reliable coverage by a single access point. It is a set of one or more infrastructure basic service sets on a common logical network segment (i.e. same IP subnet and VLAN). Key to the concept is that the participating basic service sets appear as a single network to the logical link control layer by using the same SSID. Thus, from the perspective of the logical link control layer, stations within an ESS may communicate with one another, and mobile stations may move transparently from one participating basic service set to another (within the same ESS). Extended service sets make possible distribution services such as centralized authentication. From the perspective of the link layer, all stations within an ESS are all on the same link, and transfer from one BSS to another is transparent to logical link control.

The basic service sets formed in wireless ad hoc networks are, by definition, independent from other BSSs, and an independent BSS cannot therefore be part of an extended infrastructure. In that formal sense an independent BSS has no extended service set. However, the network packets of both independent BSSs and infrastructure BSSs have a logical network service set identifier, and the logical link control does not distinguish between the use of that field to name an ESS network, and the use of that field to name a peer-to-peer ad hoc network. The two are effectively indistinguishable at the logical link control layer level.
