= MSCDEX =

MS-DOS software

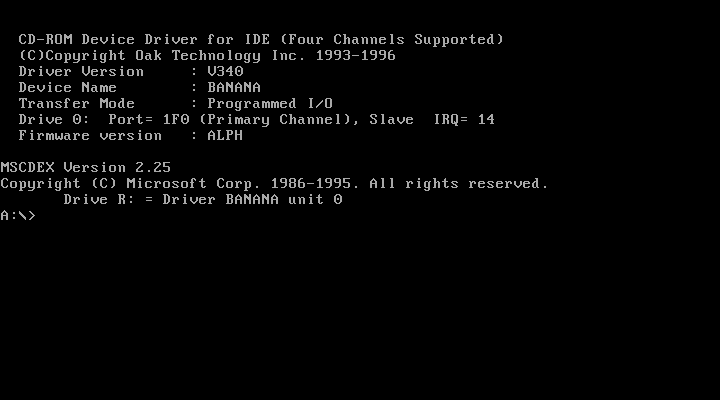
- MSCDEX as seen from a Windows 98 installation CD
- Developer: Microsoft
- Release: 1986, 39–40 years ago
- Stable release: 2.25 / 1995; 31 years ago
- Operating system: MS-DOS, Windows
- Platform: x86
- Type: Command
- License: Proprietary commercial software

MSCDEX or Microsoft CD-ROM Extensions is a software program produced by Microsoft and included with MS-DOS 6.x and certain versions of Windows to provide CD-ROM support. Earlier versions of MSCDEX since 1986 were installable add-ons for MS-DOS 3.1 and higher.

== Overview ==
The program is a driver executable which allows MS-DOS programs to recognize, read, and control CD-ROMs using the High Sierra and – since version 2.0 as of 1988 – also the ISO 9660 file systems. This requires the previous loading of an appropriate CD-ROM device driver (example: OAKCDROM.SYS), usually from CONFIG.SYS.

The final version of the MSCDEX program was 2.25, included with Windows 95 and used when creating bootable floppy disks with CD-ROM support. Starting with Windows 95, CD-ROM access became possible through a 32-bit CDFS driver.

The driver uses the Microsoft networks interface in MS-DOS. This is the reason that at least version 3.1 of MS-DOS is required. The driver essentially looks similar to a network drive from the system perspective. It is implemented as a terminate-and-stay-resident program and an extension to the redirector interface (CDEX).

Datalight ROM-DOS includes an implementation of MSCDEX.

== Alternatives ==
Novell DOS 7, Caldera OpenDOS 7.01 and DR-DOS 7.02 and higher provide a functional equivalent to MSCDEX named NWCDEX, which also runs under MS-DOS and PC DOS. It has more flexible load-high capabilities, also allowing to relocate and run in protected mode through DPMS on 286 and higher processors, thereby leaving only a 7 KB stub in conventional or upper memory (in comparison to MSCDEX, which occupies some 16 KB). Using EMS with a page frame, NWCDEX can reduce its footprint even down to a few bytes in conventional memory. In contrast to MSCDEX, the driver does not depend on undocumented DOS APIs and therefore, with a third-party helper tool named INSTCDEX, can be loaded via INSTALL statements and be fully functional in CONFIG.SYS thereby increasing chances to load the driver high and, under these operating systems, allow to load other drivers not only from hard disk but also from CD-ROM while the operating system is still processing CONFIG.SYS. An alternative solution, but less flexible, some versions of DR-DOS offer to delay the installation of a driver in CONFIG.SYS until after the DOS data segment relocation via INSTALLLAST.

Based on NWCDEX, IMS REAL/32, a successor to Novell's Multiuser DOS and Digital Research's Concurrent DOS, provides a similar driver named IMSCDEX.

A cloaked variant of MSCDEX was provided as part of Helix Software's Multimedia Cloaking product. It uses Cloaking to relocate and run in protected mode on 386 and higher processors.

Corel offered CORELCDX.COM as alternative to MSCDEX.

There's a free alternative called SHSUCDX that is used with the IDE/ATA driver UIDE.SYS first released in 2005. It is often used with FreeDOS and works with other DOSes as well.

In 1998, Caldera provided a DRFAT32 driver for DR-DOS to dynamically mount and unmount FAT32 volumes on DOS versions otherwise not natively supporting FAT32. DRFAT32 uses a variation and extension of the CDEX API in order to achieve this and work with older DOS versions.

== See also ==
- List of DOS commands
