= Apple worm =

Apple worm may refer to:

- Codling moth, organism, typical larva found in infested apples
- Apple maggot, alternative larva species in some areas
- Apple Worm, computer program
