= Brooktrout Technology =

American telecommunications company

Brooktrout, Inc.
- Formerly: Brooktrout Technology, Inc. (1984–1999)
- Company type: Public
- Industry: Telecommunications
- Founded: 1984; 42 years ago
- Founders: David Duehren; Eric Giler; Patrick Hynes
- Defunct: 2005; 21 years ago
- Fate: Acquired by EAS Group; folded into Cantata Technology, itself acquired by Dialogic Group in 2007
- Number of employees: 350 (2001, peak)

Brooktrout Technology, Inc., later Brooktrout, Inc., was an American telecommunications company based in Boston, Massachusetts, and active from 1984 to 2005. The company was initially focused on the development of hardware and software to allow personal computers to act as fax machines, similar to GammaLink's GammaFax. The company later developed fax server hardware for local area networks before ultimately pursuing Voice over IP and videoconferencing products. In 2005, the company was acquired by EAS Group, who merged Brooktrout with another company of theirs to form Cantata Technology. Cantata was in turn acquired by Dialogic Group in 2007.

== Foundation (1984–1987) ==
Brooktrout Technology was founded in 1984 in the Greater Boston area by David Duehren, Eric Giler, and Patrick Hynes, former employees of Teradyne, a maker of automatic test equipment also based in Massachusetts. All three were electrical engineers with experience in digital signal processing, gained both in university and on the job while working at Teradyne. Brooktrout struggled to gain venture capital for the first three years of their existence, owing to the founders' youth and what Giles deemed incredulity at the concept of "talk[ing] to machines". Thus, the company was initially headquartered out of Hynes' sixteenth-floor apartment in Boston. Giler, having the most pedigreed business education, was named president, while Duehren was named vice president of research and development, and Hynes was named vice president of engineering. Hynes, an avid fisherman who was said to get his best ideas while fishing for trout, came up with Brooktrout's name.

While Brooktrout had been eyeing the integration of fax capability in personal computers since its foundation, the company soft-launched with a family of expansion cards allowing PCs to receive voicemail and send phone messages. In 1985, they launched their first fax-related product, Fax-Mail, which allowed PCs to send and receive fax documents through connection to a modem. Brooktrout's competitor GammaLink had pioneered this technology with GammaFax earlier in the year. The product was met with consumer confusion and was quickly pulled from the market, with Giler deeming it too cutting-edge. In 1987, the product was relaunched in Japan, where it was met with considerable more interest, the company reviving Fax-Mail globally soon afterward, to commercial success. Brooktrout later expanded the Fax-Mail lineup to include models with more advanced features, the family as a whole ranging in prices between US$400 and $1,000 (in 1988).

In 1987, Brooktrout received its first infusion of venture capital by Tie/Communications of Shelton, Connecticut—a major telephone equipment maker worth $250 million at the time. Tie gave Brooktrout $1 million in capital in exchange for a stake in the company, allowing Brooktrout to relocate its headquarters to dedicated offices in Wellesley Hills, Massachusetts. Between 1987 and 1989, the company was able to raise $1.5 million more in capital between 50 investment groups. During this time, Brooktrout was hired by AT&T Corporation to be the OEM for elements of AT&T's Merlin PBX.

== Growth (1987–2000) ==
While Brooktrout posted losses for its first five years, the company was on track to being profitable in fiscal year 1989. That year, the company introduced its first product in their popular TR fax server product range. Called the TR112, it was an expansion card featuring two twin-channel fax transceivers, allowing a fax server with eight such TR112es installed to handle sixteen separate fax connections, with each connection being able to send and receive faxes simultaneously. The transceivers support direct inward dialing, allowing users connected to the fax server to be issued their own fax phone number, negating the need for a DTMF-based auto attendant. A piggyback board attached to the TR112 allows each transceiver to digitize and store voice-path information from a connection, allowing the server to handle, for example, DTMF signals from incoming callers corresponding to a hotline interface. Later in 1989, the company introduced the FlashFax, a turnkey fax server based on an IBM PC AT–compatible computer system and featuring a 20 MB hard drive and Brooktrout's TR-111M fax card and TR-100M3 speech digitization card. The FlashFax could serve and store up to 1,000 documents on request through a phone connection using a touch-tone keypad interface that the user could program via monitor and keyboard. The FlashFax sold fairly well for Brooktrout, prompting the company to develop a slimmer model that could store twice as many documents.

Brooktrout posted consistent growth from the turn of the 1990s through to the mid-1990s, posting profits from 1990 to at least 1995. By the end of 1990, Brooktrout employed 40 people and brought in roughly $470,000 in profit. A year later, the company netted $910,000 in profit. The company soon counted such major clients as Sharp Corporation and the publishers of Consumer Reports, who used Brooktrout's hardware to devise an on-demand article reprinting service for paying subscribers. By the mid-1990s, Brooktrout was one of the largest vendors of fax products in the United States. In September 1992, Brooktrout filed to go public, issuing its initial public offering underwritten by Tucker Anthony. Following their IPO, Brooktrout passed the $1-million profit mark.

During the 1990s, Brooktrout acquired a number of companies in the telecommunications market to help expand their portfolio. In May 1993, Brooktrout acquired DAFCom Corporation of Dallas, Texas, for an undisclosed amount. The acquisition of DAFCom allowed Brooktrout to break into the market of IP-based fax machines, with a line of fax routers for corporate wide area networks (WANs). In 1995, Brooktrout began selling fax servers specifically for local area networks under the TruFax name, this branding acting as a middle ground between their single-user fax boards and their WAN fax boards. In May 1996, Brooktrout acquired Technically Speaking, Inc., a telecommunications software vendor of Southborough, Massachusetts, for an undisclosed amount. In July 1997, Brooktrout purchased Netaccess, Inc., from Xircom of Thousand Oaks, California, allowing the company to enter the teleconferencing market with ISDN Primary Rate Interface cards. In December 1998, Brooktrout acquired the entirety of Lucent Technologies' computer telephony division for $29.4 million. The acquisition of this division from Lucent allowed Brooktrout to greatly expand their range of Voice over IP and Fax over IP products, segments in which the company had entered in the late 1990s. Reflecting their diversifying business, Brooktrout dropped the "Technology" from their name in May 1999, thereafter trading as Brooktrout, Inc.

== Decline and acquisition (2000–2005) ==
Following steady growth into the new millennium, revenue in Brooktrout dropped roughly 43 percent in the aftermath of the dot-com bubble burst of late 2000, prompting Brooktrout to freeze salaries and bonuses for top brass, to cancel trade shows, and to sell off their software division, Brooktrout Software, to eYak of Boston in 2001. Despite the revenue drop, Brooktrout were able to avoid laying off any their 350 employees. Sales slowly began recovering by 2004; in May that year, the company acquired SnowShore Networks, a developer of softphone applications based in Chelmsford, Massachusetts, for $10 million.

By 2005, Brooktrout employed 290 workers worldwide, 170 of which were based in the company's new headquarters of Needham, Massachusetts. In August 2005, EAS Group, a telecommunications holding firm based in Hyannis, Massachusetts, announced the acquisition of Brooktrout for $173 million. Immediately following the announcement of the acquisition, Giler resigned from the company. After the acquisition was finalized in the last quarter of 2005, EAS merged their Excel Switching Corporation division with Brooktrout to form Cantata Technology. In 2007, Cantata Technology was acquired by Dialogic Group of Parsippany, New Jersey.
