= Datacopy =

Defunct image scanner manufacturer

Datacopy Corporation
- Company type: Public
- Founded: April 1973; 52 years ago in Palo Alto, California, United States
- Founder: Armin Miller
- Defunct: June 1988; 37 years ago
- Fate: Acquired by Xerox
- Successor: Xerox Imaging Systems
- Key people: Rolando C. Esteverena, president (1983–1988)
- Number of employees: 120 (1987, peak)

Datacopy Corporation was an American computer hardware company independently active from 1973 to 1988. The company was a pioneer in the field of digital imaging, especially image scanners for personal computers. It was acquired by Xerox in 1988 and folded into their Xerox Imaging Systems subsidiary.

== History ==
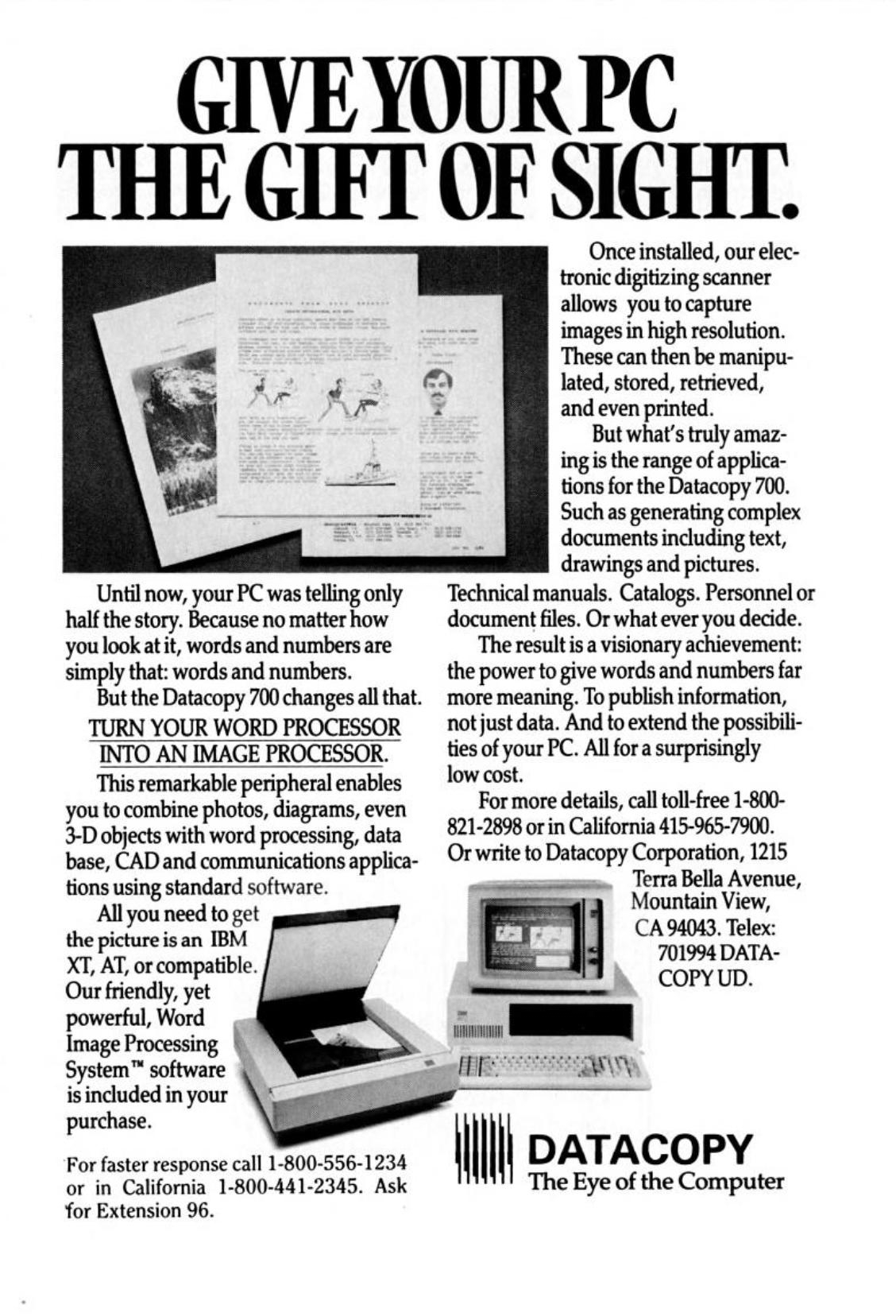
The Datacopy Model 700 was the first flatbed scanner for the IBM PC when it was released in early 1985.

Datacopy Corporation was founded in April 1973 in Palo Alto, California, by Armin Miller, who previously founded the hard disk drive manufacturer Data Disc in 1962 before leaving that company in 1970. Datacopy spent nearly the first decade of its existence as a consulting firm, developing low-cost digital imaging products for larger companies such as Hewlett-Packard and IBM. One of Datacopy's first developments was the Scan-Trac I, a very early handheld scanner making use of an array of photodiodes, storing its output onto magnetic tape. After spending nine years operating Datacopy at a low level, Miller floated the idea of marketing imaging products under the Datacopy name, and in 1982, the company released its first product, which was a document camera for minicomputers and personal computers. In 1983, Miller left Datacopy and was replaced by Rolando C. Esteverena, previously of Zilog, as president. Datacopy filed its initial public offering in September 1983, by which point none of its original executive officers from before that year remained.

In October 1983, the company introduced the Model 610, a CCD-based document camera with a 4.9-megapixel resolution. It was compatible with the IBM Personal Computer. Datacopy later released the Datacopy Model 700, which was the first flatbed scanner for the IBM PC, in early 1985. The main flatbed unit of the Model 700 was manufactured by Ricoh (originally sold by them as the Ricoh IS20) and was capable of scanning letter-sized documents at a maximum resolution of 200 dpi at 1-bit monochrome using a CCD imaging element. The Model 700 came with a special interface card for connecting to the PC, and an optional, aftermarket OCR software card and software package were sold for the Model 700. The Model 700 was unveiled at the 1984 COMDEX/Fall in November 1984, at the Las Vegas Convention Center, and slated for a January 1985 release. Ricoh later entered a joint development agreement with Datacopy to co-develop image scanners, with Datacopy providing their digital image processing prowess in software and firmware and Ricoh focusing on the hardware.

Datacopy developed a page description language by the name of PreScript, aiming to directly compete with Adobe Systems' PostScript. Introduced in 1986, it ultimately failed to gain much uptake in the desktop publishing world.

In mid-1987, Datacopy introduced Microfax, a fax interface for IBM PCs that allowed users to transmit faxes electronically via software, similar to GammaLink's GammaFax. Microfax paired with Datacopy's consumer Jetfax scanner. Within a few months on the market, Datacopy had sold 1,000 Microfax boards, becoming their second-most popular class of product behind their flatbed scanners. It received praise in The New York Times and Byte, with the latter publication dubbing Microfax "the standard against which to measure other PC fax cards".

By August 1987, Datacopy was the second-largest image scanner manufacturer for personal computers, trailing only Canon Inc. It reached its first and only profitable year in 1986, earning $120,950, the company otherwise recording losses in excess of $1.3 million between 1982 and 1985. It reported another $1.3 million loss in 1987, its final year as an independent company. Employment at Datacopy peaked at 120 workers in 1987, the company's headcount shrinking to 90 by May 1988.

In May 1988, Xerox Corporation announced that they were to acquire Datacopy for $31 million in a stock swap, pending approval from Datacopy's board of directors, with Datacopy remaining a brand of Xerox while being a wholly owned subsidrary. With the acquisition, Xerox was poised to become the largest manufacturer of image scanners; it had last acquired Kurzweil Computer Products, another pioneering image scanner firm, from Ray Kurzweil in 1980. The acquisition was approved and finalized a month later, and in October 1988, Xerox folded Datacopy into their Kurzweil division to found Xerox Imaging Systems, a division dedicated to digital imaging products. Esteverena was originally retained as president of the division but clashed with Xerox's management style and left shortly afterward. Xerox retained the Datacopy name for products until 1991, when it shut down Datacopy's original facility in the Bay Area.

== See also ==
- Dacom
- SpectraFAX
