= DR-WebSpyder =

Graphical web browser for DOS and Linux

- Caldera DR-WebSpyder with on-screen keyboard in 1998
- Other names: Embrowser
- Developers: Caldera UK, Caldera Thin Clients
- Release: 1997; 29 years ago
- Stable release: 2.5 / October 1999; 27 years ago
- Operating system: DOS
- Type: Web browser

DR-WebSpyder is a DOS web browser, mail client and operating system runtime environment that was developed by Caldera UK in 1997. It was based on the DR-DOS operating system and networking components from Novell as well as the Arachne web browser by Michal Polák of xChaos software. The system was designed to run on low-end desktop systems, but being able to boot and execute from disk as well as from ROM or network, it was also tailored for x86-based thin clients and embedded systems with or without disk drives. Using the web browser as its principal user interface, it could be also used for kiosk systems and set-top boxes. It was ported to Linux in 1999 under the name Embrowser and was renamed Embedix Browser in 2000.

== NIOS and IOS ==
DR-WebSpyder was originally conceived as project NIOS (Novell Internet Operating System) at Novell's European Development Centre (EDC), UK in 1994 by then DR-DOS engineer Roger Alan Gross, who was working on Novell's Embedded Systems Technology (NEST) initiative to create embedded system applications that connect intelligent devices to NetWare networks. NIOS was conceived as a thin client operating system that provided Novell with a graphical client operating system to run web applications hosted on NetWare, creating a Novell-centric platform for software as a service (SaaS) that did not require Microsoft's Windows operating system. NIOS comprised 32-bit versions of Novell's existing 16-bit DOS technologies including the DR-DOS operating system, Novell's modem dialer and TCP/IP stack from LAN Workplace for DOS / NetWare Mobile plus licensed third-party components such as the Kaffe Java virtual machine (JVM), Allegro for graphics, and Mosaic for the web browser.

== WebSpyder, WebSpyder 32 and DR-WebSpyder ==
Gross's plans were interrupted when Caldera, Inc. acquired the remaining Digital Research assets including DR-DOS from Novell on 23 July 1996, but without the personnel. Gross telephoned Caldera's Ransom H. Love the same day offering to set up a new DR-DOS team outside of Novell. Gross subsequently joined Caldera as general manager of the Digital Research Systems Group (DSG) in December that year and set about rehiring the DRDOS/NIOS team in the UK to develop the new operating system and web browser. Under Caldera, NIOS was renamed IOS (Internet Operating System). The plan to use Mosaic was also dropped and instead Caldera licensed the source code of the 16-bit DOS web browser Arachne. The team replaced Arachne's dialer and packet drivers with Novell's dialer, ODI driver suite (from Personal NetWare etc.) and TCP/IP stack, added support for animated and scaled GIFs, an optional on-screen keyboard for mouse and touch panel usage (SoftKeyboards) for possible keyboardless operation, and an install program. Also, they completely changed the design of the browser (customizable chrome), implemented support for NetScape-compatible frames, and used Allegro for graphics. The browser also supported "execute links" to run and interact with DOS programs and batchjobs run on the web client, a feature originally introduced as DOS Gateway Interface (DGI) in Arachne. IOS became formally known as WebSpyder in May 1997. Some months later, it was ported to compile as a 32-bit protected mode extended DOS application (utilizing DPMI using DJGPP, a GNU compiler for DOS), then referred to as WebSpyder 32, but renamed DR-WebSpyder in early 1998.

On 11 May 1998, Caldera started shipping DR-WebSpyder 2.0 as both a HTML 3.2 web browser application and browser OS. On 1 June 1998, the company opened a sales and support office in Taiwan to be close to potential OEM customers.

A maintenance release DR-WebSpyder 2.0a was issued on 19 August 1998.

Caldera distributed a free demo version of DR-WebSpyder 2.0a on a self-booting disk. This was in fact the DR-WebSpyder OS configured as loosely coupled components in which a special version of the DR-DOS ANSI.SYS driver would mute the stream of text messages at startup of the DOS system (Note: Non-standard escape sequences ESC [ + and ESC [ - to disable and reenable any output to the CON: device are supported by ANSI.SYS of DR-DOS 7.02 and higher only. They are used to mute the console output during boot, for example in conjunction with DR-WebSpyder boot floppies.) while a graphical company logo was displayed until the web browser was launched as a shell via CONFIG.SYS SHELL replacing the default COMMAND.COM command line interpreter. (Note: This is similar to what happens in Windows 95, 98, SE and ME.) On 386 PCs with a minimum of 4 MB of RAM, the floppy would boot the DR-DOS 7.02 based browser operating system complete with memory manager, RAM disk, dial-up modem, LAN, mouse and display drivers and automatically launch into the graphical browser, without ever touching the machine's hard disk in order not to interfere with other systems installed on the machine and to demonstrate its potential usage in diskless workstations. Users could start browsing the web or accessing mails immediately after entering their access credentials. A further refined international revision of the demo by Matthias R. Paul utilized more sophisticated multi-level compression to free enough space on the floppy image to also include menu options and additional drivers to choose between several languages and keyboard layouts and give room for further expansion or customization of the operation system and browser through OEMs or users.

On 2 September 1998, it was announced that the Digital Research Systems Group and consequently also Caldera UK was spun out as a separate company Caldera Thin Clients (CTC), incorporated earlier in August 1998.

In September 1998, DR-WebSpyder 2.0 achieved commercial success when it was selected for use in an internet set-top box as part of a satellite internet access solution.

On 3 November 1998, the company announced DR-WebSpyder 2.1. With DR-WebSpyder 2.1 Beta 2 being available since 7 November 1998, the browser was released on 30 November 1998. It added support for JavaScript, the Secure Sockets Layer (SSL) protocol, cookies, sound files, printing on a multitude of printers as well as user profiles and support for multiple mail accounts. It also added scrollable quarter-screen VGA support for low-resolution LCD displays as well as anti-aliased fonts for display on TVs in an optional TV interface mode.

Caldera UK also investigated possibilities to add Java and JVM support to the browser, but this component never left prototype status. Two desired prerequisites for Java integration were to add support for long filenames (LFNs) (Note: For comparison, in order to support Java applications without implementing a VFAT-compatible scheme, the FlexOS-based IBM 4690 OS version 2 introduced its own virtual file system (VFS) architecture to store long filenames in the FAT file system in a backwards compatible fashion. If enabled, the virtual filenames (VFN) are available under separate logical drive letters, whereas the real filenames (RFN) remain available under the original drive letters.) and Unicode to DOS. Caldera's DPMS-enabled dynamically loadable LONGNAME driver provided VFAT-compatible LFNs in the FAT file system utilizing UCS-2 internally. Matthias R. Paul conducted research how to achieve this with minimal changes to the existing system and to not cause bloat to an operating system also tailored for thin clients and embedded systems. Expanded DRFONT-style .CPI files could have been provided to retrieve bitmaps for the required larger character repertoire (Basic Multilingual Plane or Windows Glyph List 4) not only to support a lot more code pages in general, but also wider character sets similar to what was used in DOS/V-compatible systems. In conjunction with a new COUNTRY.SYS file, Paul's enhanced NLSFUNC 4.xx driver, which was introduced with DR-DOS 7.02, could have provided the framework to integrate optional UTF-8 support into the system in a way similar to DBCS support.

When Gross resigned in January 1999, Caldera Thin Clients, Inc. closed the Caldera UK Ltd. development office in February 1999 soon after the release of DR-DOS 7.03.

== Embrowser and Embedix Browser ==
A customized version of Lineo Embrowser in 1999

On 20 July 1999, Caldera Thin Clients renamed itself into Lineo under the new lead of Bryan Wayne Sparks. DR-WebSpyder was renamed Embrowser and the browser was said to be ported to Linux.

A version of DR-WebSpyder for IMS REAL/32, a successor to Digital Research's and Novell's Multiuser DOS, has been worked on in 1999 as well.

Since October 1999, a DOS version of DR-WebSpyder 2.5 aka Embrowser 2.5 was available on Lineo's site.

Since Lineo's own thin-client Linux distribution was named Embedix, the Linux port of the micro web browser was consequently named Embedix Browser by April 2000.

In April 2002, some Lineo assets were auctioned off and the company reformed as Embedix, Inc. by July 2002 under the lead of Matthew R. Harris. Motorola's Metrowerks bought Embedix key assets, possibly including the browser, on 17 December 2002.

== See also ==
- Arachne (web browser)
- Citrix WinFrame
- ChromeOS
- FreeDOS
- Comparison of web browsers
- List of web browsers
- LAN WorkPlace for DOS
- Caldera View
- iCentrix MarioNet
- Novell Corsair
- WebTV
