= Hank Magnuski =

American engineer

- H. S. Magnuski
- Born: Henry Stanley Magnuski; August 4, 1944 (age 82); Chicago, Illinois, US
- Education: University of Illinois at Urbana-Champaign, Massachusetts Institute of Technology
- Occupation: Telecommunications Engineer
- Parent: Henryk Magnuski

Henry "Hank" Stanley Magnuski is an American engineer and was the co-founder and CEO of GammaLink, an early pioneer in PC-to-fax technology. He also founded Internet Video Services, a video service provider; MediaMart, an electronic commerce site; and NCast, a presentation technology company.

Magnuski graduated from University of Illinois at Urbana-Champaign with a BSEE in Electrical Engineering in 1965, and an MSEE from MIT in 1966. He holds a Ph.D. in Electrical Engineering from MIT and conducted postdoctoral work at Stanford University.

In 1995, Magnuski received the Fax Industry Award from BIS, now Giga Information Group, Inc.

The Department of Electrical and Computer Engineering of the University of Illinois, in 1998, recognized Magnuski as a Distinguished Alumni "In recognition of outstanding contributions to the telecommunications industry, including pioneering work in the area of PC-fax Technology."

In 1980 Magnuski established the first packet repeater for amateur radio in the US. This repeater, KA6M/R, located in the San Francisco Bay area, created interest in packet radio technology and led to the establishment of the Pacific Packet Radio Society.

Magnuski and his wife, Cynthia Jose, established the Henry Magnuski Endowed Professorship at the Department of Electrical and Computer Engineering at the University of Illinois in honor of his father, Henryk Magnuski.

A patent in multicast videoconferencing was granted to Magnuski in 2007.
