= Arachne (web browser) =

Graphical web browser for DOS and Linux

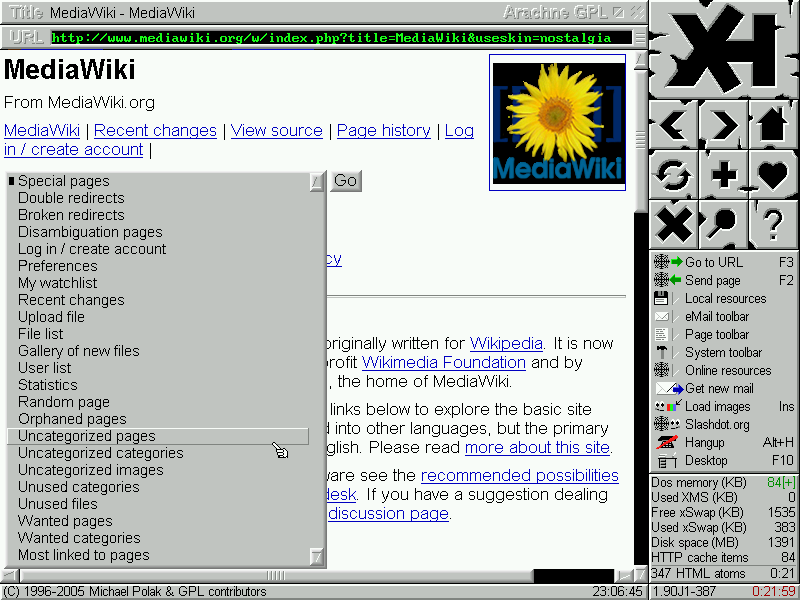
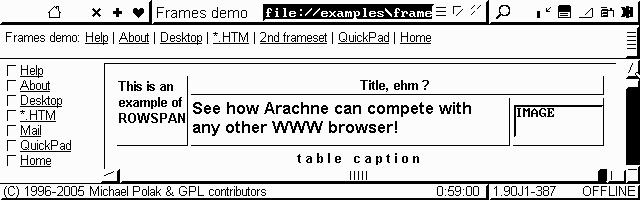
- Arachne GPL web browser using its VESA and CGA display modes, respectively
- Developers: Michael Polák and contributors
- Release: 22 December 1996; 29 years ago
- Stable release: 1.99 / 23 December 2021; 4 years ago
- Preview release: none [±]
- Written in: C
- Operating system: DOS, Linux
- Type: Internet suite
- License: GPL-2.0-only
- Website: www.glennmcc.org, web.archive.org/web/20150201105844/http://arachne.cz/?page=soft

Arachne is an Internet suite containing a graphical web browser, email client, and dialer. Originally, Arachne was developed by Michal Polák under his xChaos label, a name he later changed into Arachne Labs. It was written in C and compiled using Borland C++ 3.1. Arachne has since been released under the GPL as Arachne GPL.

Arachne primarily runs on DOS-based operating systems, but there are also builds available for Linux. The Linux version of Arachne utilizes SVGALib, allowing it to function without requiring a display server.

== Background ==
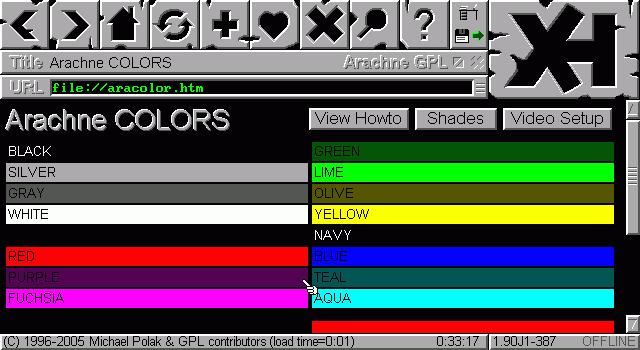
Screenshot of the Arachne web browser using the 640×350 graphics mode. The screenshot contains 14 colors.

Arachne supports many file formats, protocols and standards including video modes from CGA 640×200 in monochrome to VESA 1024×768 in high color mode (65536 colors). It is designed for systems that do not have any windowing system installed.

Arachne supports multiple image formats including JPEG, PNG, BMP and animated GIF. It supports a subset of the HTML 4.0 and CSS 1.0 standards, including full support for tables and frames. Supported protocols include FTP, NNTP for USENET forums, POP3, SMTP and Gopher. Arachne includes a full-fledged TCP/IP connection suite, which has support for some dial-up and Ethernet connections. However, Arachne has no support for JavaScript, Java or SSL. Arachne can be expanded with the use of add-ons for such tasks as watching DivX movies, playing MP3 files, IRC chat, RSS and viewing PDF documents. Arachne also supports DOS Gateway Interface (DGI), a unique feature similar to Common Gateway Interface (CGI) scripting on the client.

The first version of Arachne with a known release date was 1.0 Beta 2, which was released on 22 December 1996. The final and official version by Arachne Labs was 1.70R3 for DOS (released 22 January 2001) and 1.66 beta for Linux (released 20 July 2000). While there have been several more DOS versions, Linux development lay dormant until 24 May 2008 when a beta version 1.93 for Linux was released. The current DOS version, maintained by Glenn McCorkle, is 1.99 as of 23 December 2021. In 2006, there also was an experimental DPMI port of Arachne by Udo Kuhnt, named DPMI Arachne.

== Support ==
Arachne supports a limited subset of stylesheets and HTML. Known support as of version 1.93:

Style	Aliases	Options
color		#rgb or #rrggbb or a color name
background-color	background	#rgb or #rrggbb or a color name
font-size		%, px, pt
font-style		i[talics]
font-weight		b[old]
text-decoration	font-decoration	u[nderline]

== Derivatives ==
xChaos software licensed the source code of Arachne to Caldera UK in 1997. Caldera UK added Novell's dialer and TCP/IP stack, JavaScript, SSL, implemented their own support for frames, added support for animated GIFs, audio output, printing on a multitude of printers, an optional on-screen keyboard for mouse and touch panel usage (SoftKeyboards), user profiles, and they completely changed the design of the browser (customizable), using Allegro for graphics. Also, they ported it to compile as a 32-bit protected mode extended DOS application (utilizing DPMI using DJGPP, a GNU compiler for DOS), while Arachne is a 16-bit application. This program was sold as DR-WebSpyder in 1998; the name was to associate it with DR-DOS, which Caldera owned at the time.

When Caldera had transferred DR-DOS to its branch company Caldera Thin Clients, which renamed itself into Lineo in 1999, the browser was referred to under the name Embrowser. Since 2000, the Linux port of the browser has been called Embedix Browser.

== See also ==
- Comparison of web browsers
- Lynx (text-based)
- FreeDOS
- List of web browsers
- MINUET (graphical)
- List of Usenet newsreaders
- Comparison of Usenet newsreaders
