= Lsmod =

Linux command that lists loaded kernel modules

lsmod is a command on Linux systems that lists each loadable kernel module that is loaded.

Example output from lsmod:

Module                  Size  Used by
af_packet              27392  2 
8139too                30592  0 
snd_cs46xx             96872  3 
snd_pcm_oss            55808  1 
snd_mixer_oss          21760  2 snd_pcm_oss
ip6table_filter         7424  1 
ip6_tables             19728  1 ip6table_filter
ipv6                  290404  22 
xfs                   568384  4 
sis900                 18052  5 
libata                169920  1 pata_sis
scsi_mod              158316  3 usb_storage,sd_mod,libata
usbcore               155312  6 ohci_hcd, usb_storage, usbhid

The Module column contains the name of a module. The Size column indicates the size in bytes of a module (not memory used). The Used by column indicates how many times the module is in use by running programs. To the right of that is a list of other modules which refer to this one, but this list is sometimes incomplete. If the module controls its own unloading via a can_unload routine then the used-by count shows as -1, irrespective of the actual count.

== See also ==
- modprobe
