= Personal NetWare =

Network system

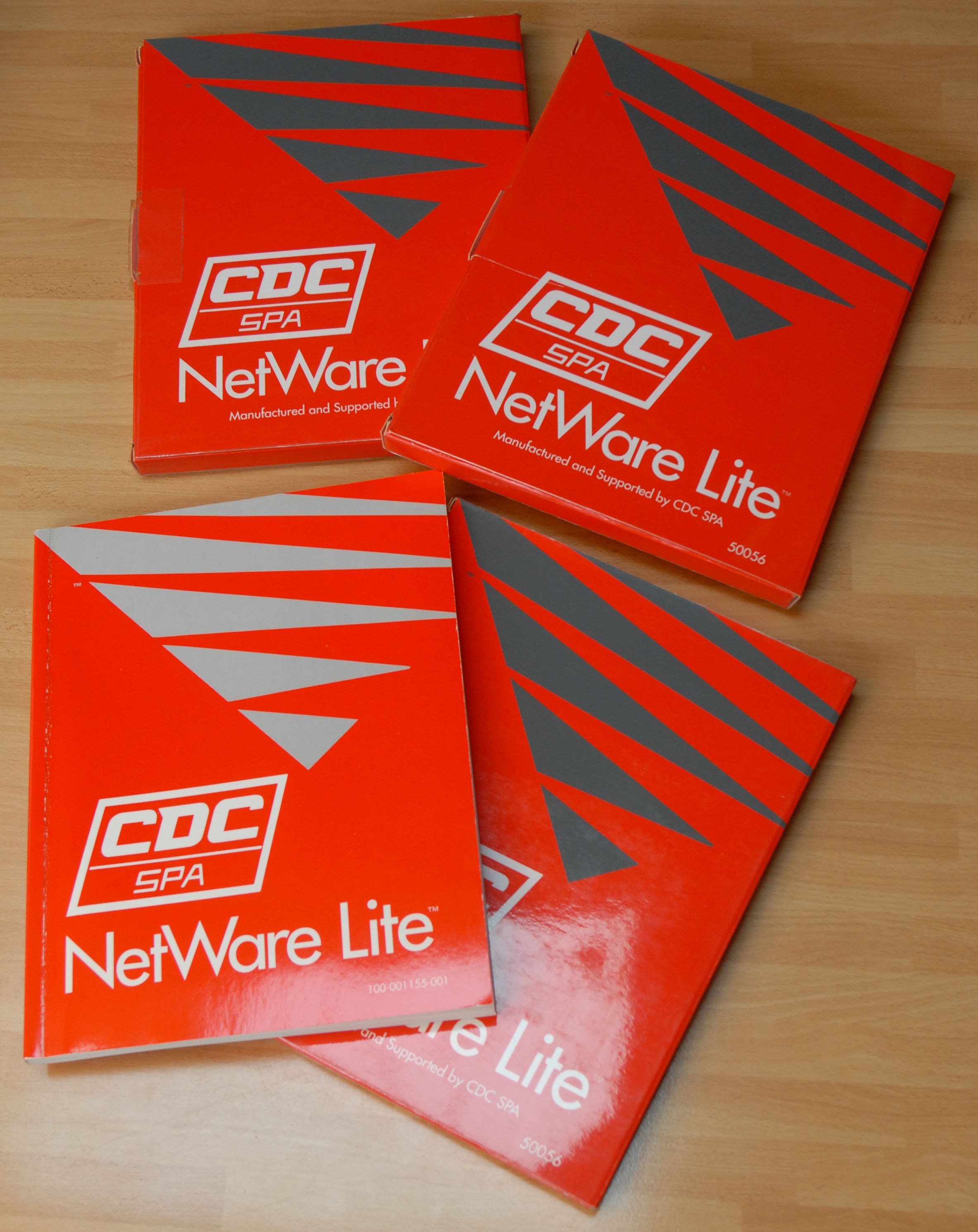
NetWare Lite, as released by the Italian firm CDC S.p.A.

NetWare Lite and Personal NetWare are a series of discontinued peer-to-peer local area networks developed by Novell for DOS- and Windows-based personal computers aimed at personal users and small businesses in the 1990s.

== NetWare Lite ==
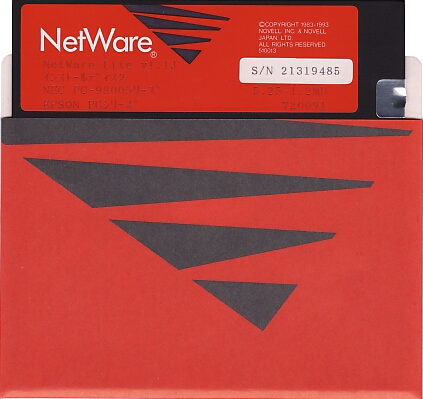
Floppy disk of NetWare Lite 1.1J

In 1991, Novell introduced NetWare Lite 1.0 (NWL), as a radically different and cheaper alternative to their central server-based NetWare product. Codenamed "Slurpee", NetWare Lite was an answer to Artisoft's similar LANtastic: both were peer-to-peer systems, where no dedicated server was required, but instead all PCs on the network could share their resources.

Netware Lite contained a unique serial number in the EXE files that prevented running the same copy on multiple nodes within a single network. This basic copy protection was easily circumvented by comparing files from different licenses and accordingly editing the serial number bytes.

The product was upgraded to NetWare Lite 1.1 and also came bundled with DR DOS 6.0. Some components of NetWare Lite were used in Novell's NetWare PalmDOS 1.0 in 1992.

A Japanese version of NetWare Lite named "NetWare Lite 1.1J" existed in 1992 for four platforms (DOS/V, Fujitsu FM-R, NEC PC-98/Epson PC and Toshiba J-3100) and was supported up to 1997. Updates were distributed by Novell as DOSV6.EXE, DOSV.EXE, TSBODI.LZH.

NetWare Lite 1.1 came bundled with NLSNIPES, a newer implementation of Novell's Snipes game.

== Personal NetWare ==
Significantly reworked, the product line, codenamed "Smirnoff", became Personal NetWare 1.0 (PNW) in 1994. The ODI/VLM 16-bit DOS client portion of the drivers now supported individually loadable Virtual Loadable Modules (VLMs) for an improved flexibility and customizability, whereas the server portion could utilize Novell's DOS Protected Mode Services (DPMS), if loaded, to reduce its conventional memory footprint and run in extended memory and protected mode. The NetWare Lite disk cache NLCACHE had been reworked into NWCACHE, which was easier to set up and could utilize DPMS as well, thereby reducing the DOS memory footprint and significantly speeding up disk performance. Personal NetWare came bundled with the network-enabled game NetWars 2.06.

A Japanese version of Personal NetWare 1.0 named "Personal NetWare J 1.0" existed for four platforms (DOS/V, Fujitsu FM-R, NEC PC-98/Epson PC and Toshiba J-3100) and was supported up to 1995. Updates were distributed by Novell as P10J0?.EXE (with ? replaced by 1 - 5), PNDOSV2.EXE, PNDOSV1.LZH.

The Personal NetWare 1.0 product saw five maintenance upgrades for the Western issues and two for the Japanese versions as well as various comprehensive updates to the corresponding VLM client driver suite (1.0, 1.1, 1.20, 1.21) as part of the Novell Client Kit for DOS & Windows up to November 1996 in the Western world and up to April 1997 in Japan. They added many new MLID (Media Link Interface Driver) drivers, including drivers for SLIP and PPP, as well as extra codepages and languages.

A full version of Personal NetWare (save the interactive tutorials) also came bundled with Novell DOS 7 in 1994 at a price similar to that of the stand-alone version of Personal NetWare.

Portions of Personal NetWare were incorporated into Novell's LAN Workplace for DOS and NetWare Mobile for DOS products, and as such compatible TCP/IP drivers became available for the system as well.

Later, Personal NetWare was bundled with full versions of Caldera OpenDOS 7.01, DR-DOS 7.02 and 7.03 between 1997 and 1999; however, these bundles were delivered with the same Personal NetWare files shipping with Novell DOS 7, not the upgraded files, which had been made available for download by Novell since 1994.

The ODI/VLM client stack with TCP/IP drivers also found its way into the DR-WebSpyder distribution in 1997.

When Novell in 1996 introduced its ODI32/NIOS 32-bit DOS/Windows client (Client 32), it used NetWare Loadable Modules (NLMs) instead of VLM modules. While the NIOS client could reduce the conventional memory footprint down to 2 to 5 KB in total, the lack of something like a "PNW.NLM" module (in analogy to the VLM client's PNW.VLM) made it impossible to use the new client in conjunction with a Personal NetWare server.

== NetWare clients for DOS ==
- NETX-based 16-bit client for DOS
- ODI/VLM-based 16-bit client for DOS
- ODI32/NIOS-based 32-bit client for DOS (not for NWL and PNW)

== See also ==
- CP/NET / MP/NET / DR Net / FlexNet
- ELS NetWare (former entry level product, but not peer-to-peer)
- IntranetWare for Small Business (FSB) (later entry level product, but not peer-to-peer)
- NetWare Remote Program Load (RPL)
- NetWare NCOPY
- UnixWare
