= Henryk Magnuski =

Polish telecommunications engineer

Henryk W. Magnuski
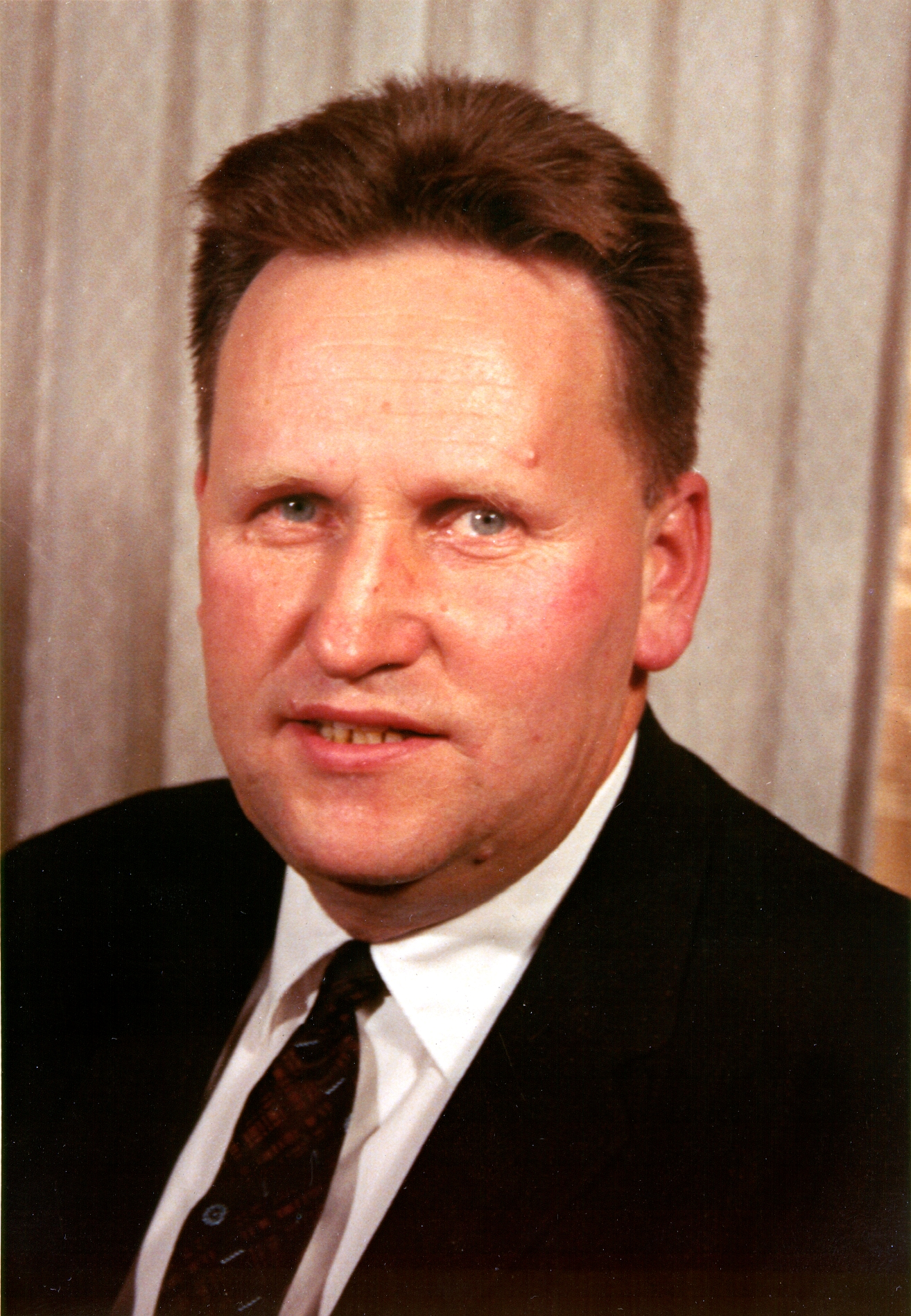
- Magnuski in 1959
- Born: January 30, 1909; Warsaw, Congress Poland
- Died: May 4, 1978 (aged 69); Glenview, Illinois, United States
- Education: Warsaw University of Technology
- Occupations: telecommunications engineer, inventor
- Known for: walkie-talkie
- Relatives: Hank Magnuski (son)

Henryk Władysław Magnuski (January 30, 1909 – May 4, 1978) was a Polish telecommunications engineer who worked for Motorola in Chicago. He was a primary contributor to the development of one of the first Walkie-Talkie radios, the Motorola SCR-300, and influenced the company's success in the field of radio communication.

== Early years ==
Magnuski was born on January 30, 1909, in Warsaw. Having lost both parents at a relatively early age, he supported himself and his sister, Janina, by fixing and installing radios for the Polish military. He received his degree from Warsaw University of Technology in 1934 and started working for the State Tele- and Radiotechnical Works (Państwowe Zakłady Tele i Radiotechniczne) in Warsaw.

In June 1939 he was sent by his company to New York in order to study the latest American projects of radio transmitters. Soon after his arrival to the United States, Poland was invaded by Germany and World War II broke out. His return home became impossible.

== Motorola ==
In 1940 he started working for the Galvin Manufacturing Corporation in Chicago (the company changed the name in 1947 to Motorola) and assigned to a team that developed the SCR-300, the first radio used by American forces in Europe to be called a "Walkie-Talkie". As principal RF engineer on the project and named on three patents for the device, Magnuski is sometimes credited as having "invented the Walkie-Talkie in America". He later received a U. S. Navy Certificate of Commendation for Outstanding Service for development of the AN/CPN-6 Radar Beacon, a microwave device which aided carrier pilots to find their ship during low visibility conditions.

After the war he did not return to the communist People's Republic of Poland and stayed in the USA. He helped in the development of VHF cavity resonators that allowed adjacent channel operation, was a key designer for the Motorola Sensicon receiver which used a selective filter in front of the IF amplifier and created microwave relay equipment for use in transmitting multi-channel telephone, data and TV. In Motorola's Government Electronics Division he developed the SSB Radio Central Concept AN/USC-3, Motorola’s RADEM system (RADAS), the Deltaplex I digital troposcatter system and lightweight tropo equipment AN/TRC-105.

== Retirement ==
At retirement after 30 years of cooperation with the company, he was the Associate Director of Research for Motorola's Government Electronics Division, had 30 patents related to VHF and microwave communications, was an IEEE Fellow and author of numerous technical papers and a chapter in the "Communication System Engineering Handbook".

He succumbed to cancer at his home in Glenview, Illinois on May 4, 1978.

The Henry Magnuski Electrical and Computer Engineering professorship at the University of Illinois at Urbana-Champaign is named in his honor.

On October 6, 2006, Henryk Magnuski was one of the first five inductees into the Illinois Engineering Hall of Fame.

Polish TVP aired a documentary on the life of Henryk Magnuski on January 27, 2021. It was the first in a series of documentaries on famous Polish scientists and inventors.

== Personal life ==
Magnuski's son is Hank Magnuski, pioneer of PC-to-fax technology.

== Publications ==
- H. Magnuski. Cavity Resonators in Mobile Communications. Communications, August, 1949
- H. Magnuski. Application of Microwave Relay to Commercial Communication Systems. 1949 Southwestern I.R.E. Conference - Dallas, Texas
- H. Magnuski. Private Line Microwave Systems. IRE Professional Group on Vehicular Communications National Meeting - Detroit, Michigan, November 3, 1950
- H. Magnuski. Adjacent Channel Rejection Receiver. Electronics Magazine, January, 1951
- H. Magnuski. The Microwave Relay Communication System - General Technical Philosophy & Specific Engineering Solution. Fourth Southwestern IRE Conference - Houston Texas, May 17, 1952
- H. Magnuski, Theodore F. Koch. Passive Repeater Bends Microwave Beam. Electronics Magazine, February, 1953
- H. Magnuski, Harold A. Jones. Packaged Microwave Relay Systems. Radio Electronic Engineering, March, 1953
- H. Magnuski. The Microwave Relay and its Relationship to VHF Vehicular Communication. I.R.E. Convention - Washington, D.C., June 23, 1953
- H. Magnuski, Dr. William L. Firestone, Angus MacDonald. Modulation Sideband Splatter of VHF and UHF Transmitters. Proceedings of the National Electronic Conference, Vol 10 February, 1955
- H. Magnuski. An Explanation of Fading in Microwave Relay Systems. IRE National Convention, March 21, 1955
- H. Magnuski. An Explanation of Microwave Fading and Its Correction by Frequency Diversity. Winter General Meeting of the AIEE, January 30, 1956
- H. Magnuski. Comparison of SSB and FM for VHF Mobile Service. Proceedings of the I.R.E, Vol. 44 No. 12, December, 1956
- H. Magnuski. Comparison of SSB and FM for VHF Mobile Service. IRE Transactions on Vehicular Communications, PGVC-9, June, 1957
- Dr. William L. Firestone, H. Magnuski, Roy A. Richardson. Single Sideband for Mobile Applications. AIEE Fall General Meeting - Chicago, Illinois, October 11, 1957
- Dr. William L. Firestone, H. Magnuski, A. A. MacDonald, R. A. Richardson. Synchronous SSB for Communications. Electronic Industries, April, 1958
- Dr. William L. Firestone, H. Magnuski. Report on Single Sideband Communications. New York Section of AIEE, April 30, 1958
- Dr. William L. Firestone, H. Magnuski. SSB for Spectrum Conservation. Globe Com II - St. Petersburg, Florida, December 3, 1958
- H. Magnuski. Single Sideband for Communications. CMEC Communications Symposium, June 11, 1959
- H. Magnuski. Jamming of Communications Systems Using FM, AM and SSB Modulation. IRE Transactions on Military Electronics, MIL-5 No. 1 8-11, January, 1961
- H. Magnuski. Wideband Channel for Emergency Communications. IRE Transactions on Vehicular Communications, Vol. VC-10 No. 2, August, 1961
- Willis DeHart, H. Magnuski. Analysis of Random Access Discrete Address System. IRE Eighth National Communications Symposium, October, 1962
- H. Magnuski. RADA and Satellite Communications. 1962 National Symposium on Space Electronics and Telemetry - Miami Beach, October 2, 1962
- H. Magnuski. RADAS - A New Concept in Communications Systems. Motorola Engineering Bulletin, Vol. 11, Issues 1 and 2, 1963
- H. Magnuski. Anti-Jamming Characteristics of RADAS. IRE Winter Convention on Military Electronics - Los Angeles, February, 1963
- H. Magnuski. RADAS and Satellite Communication. National Symposium on Space Electronics and Telemetry, October 2, 1962
- H. Magnuski. Microwave Fading and its Correction by Diversity Reception. Wire and Radio Communications, November, 1964
- H. Magnuski, W. Braun, L. Engelbrecht, F. R. Steel. Delta-Multiplex for Long Tropo Scatter Links. IEEE International Convention, 1965
- H. Magnuski. Deltaplex - A Novel Solution to Troposcatter Communications Problems. Fourth Canadian Symposium on Communications, October 14, 1966
- H. Magnuski, L. Engelbrecht, W. E. Yost, Jr. Digital Techniques Promise New Applications for Tropo. Signal Magazine, 1967
- H. Magnuski. Upgrading the Tropo Span. Motorola Engineering Bulletin. April 4, 1967
- H. Magnuski. The Principles of Vehicular Communication Systems Design. IEEE First Symposium on Vehicular Communications Systems, May 25, 1967
- H. Magnuski. Chapter 18 - Address Communication Systems. Communication System Engineering Handbook - Donald. H. Hamsher, Ed., June, 1967, McGraw-Hill, NY. ISBN 0-07-025960-7
- H. Magnuski. A Novel Solution to Troposcatter Communication Problems. Telecommunications, January, 1968

== US Patents ==
- US2,398,793 Radio receiving system
- US2,408,791 Radio communications system
- US2,409,139 Radio receiving system
- US2,608,648 Highly selective radio receiver
- US2,608,649 Highly selective radio receiver
- US2,637,782 Resonant cavity filter
- US2,699,495 Automatic switchover system for radio relay
- US2,699,496 Microwave relay test system
- US2,713,664 Limiter for phase modulation
- US2,734,131 Communication system with carrier strength control
- US2,782,300 Modulation meter
- US2,803,802 Deviation Calibrator
- US2,813,198 Microwave system
- US2,852,730 Power supply
- US2,860,238 Diversity receiving system
- US2,892,930 Communication system
- US2,959,673 Radio receiver squelch control
- US3,235,768 Variable microwave phase shifter utilizing plasma electrode
- US3,292,086 System for converting a train of binary zeroes to a train of alternating ones and zeroes and vice versa
- US3,292,178 Communication system
- US3,361,970 Selection of frequencies for minimum depth of fading in a frequency diversity microwave line of sight relay link
- US3,380,023 Electronic alarm system
- US3,392,392 Bearing measurement system using statistical signal processing by analog techniques
- US3,406,775 Vehicular speed indicator, odometer and automatic speed control system
- US3,453,562 Delta modulator with uniform quantizing steps
- US3,467,783 Speech bandwidth reduction by sampling 1/n cycles storing the samples, and reading the samples out at 1/n the sampling rate
- US3,471,646 Time division multiplex system with prearranged carrier frequency shifts
- US3,506,966 Pulse coded, wide band radio communication system
- US3,532,988 Digital troposcatter multiplex communication system optimum frequency
- US3,646,441 Digital radio communication systems using repeaters operating at same frequency

== See also ==
- Timeline of Polish science and technology
- List of Poles
