= Helix Netroom =

Netroom (originally styled NETROOM) is a DOS memory manager produced by Helix Software Company in the 1990s. Introduced in August 1990, NETROOM was originally titled "LAN Memory Manager." Version 1.0 of NETROOM was a re-packaged version of Helix's HeadRoom with the HeadRoom Network Extensions, bundled together and targeted to network users. NETROOM loaded network drivers into a virtual machine created using an expanded memory page frame. NETROOM allowed this virtual machine to run as a multitasked background process. NETROOM included support for Novell NetWare, Banyan VINES, and LAN Manager networks. NETROOM was originally available only in multi-user packs starting with a four user license.

Helix introduced version 1.10 of NETROOM, in January 1991, with a single-user license. This version included support for Microsoft Windows 3.0, and added an integrated 286 and 386 expanded memory manager. The NETROOM 286/386 memory manager provided access to expanded memory and extended memory on Intel 80386 or newer systems as well as on Intel 80286 systems based on the Chips and Technologies NEAT chipset.

In June 1991, NETROOM v2.0 added MS-DOS 5 compatibility and an automatic setup and configuration tool named "Customize." NETROOM 2.0 continued to focus on virtual machine task-switching as its primary memory management technology. In January 1992, NETROOM v2.1 added a "Quantum" memory management feature which could relocate the system and video BIOS into the High Memory Area.

In 1992 Helix licensed some of the technology from NETROOM 2.1 to Microsoft. This technology was incorporated into the EMM386 and MEMMAKER programs in MS-DOS 6, which was released in March 1993.

Concurrently with the release of MS-DOS 6, Helix released NETROOM v3.0 which included the Helix Cloaking technology. NETROOM 3 contained a variety of cloaked utilities, including system and video BIOS licensed from Award Software, an animated screen saver, a disk cache, and a RAM drive.

The final version of NETROOM, v3.04, was released in late 1994 and included compatibility with Windows 95. The Cloaking driver continued as the basis for the Multimedia Cloaking and Multimedia Stacker products released in 1994 and 1995.
