= SpectraFAX =

SpectraFAX Corporation
- Formerly: LaserFAX, Inc.
- Company type: Private
- Founded: June 1984; 41 years ago in Naples, Florida, United States
- Founder: Robert Lee
- Defunct: April 2002; 23 years ago
- Fate: Acquired by DFI Communications
- Successor: Streem Communications
- Number of employees: 16 (1985)
- Website: spectrafax.com (archived)

SpectraFAX Corporation, formerly LaserFAX, Inc., was an American computer hardware company based in Naples, Florida, and active from 1984 to 2002. SpectraFAX was a pioneer in image scanning technology, developing the first flatbed scanner capable of scanning in color. It achieved little commercial success in this field, however, and pivoted to developing fax-to-PC hardware in the late 1980s. It was far more successful in the latter field and survived into the early 21st century.

== History ==
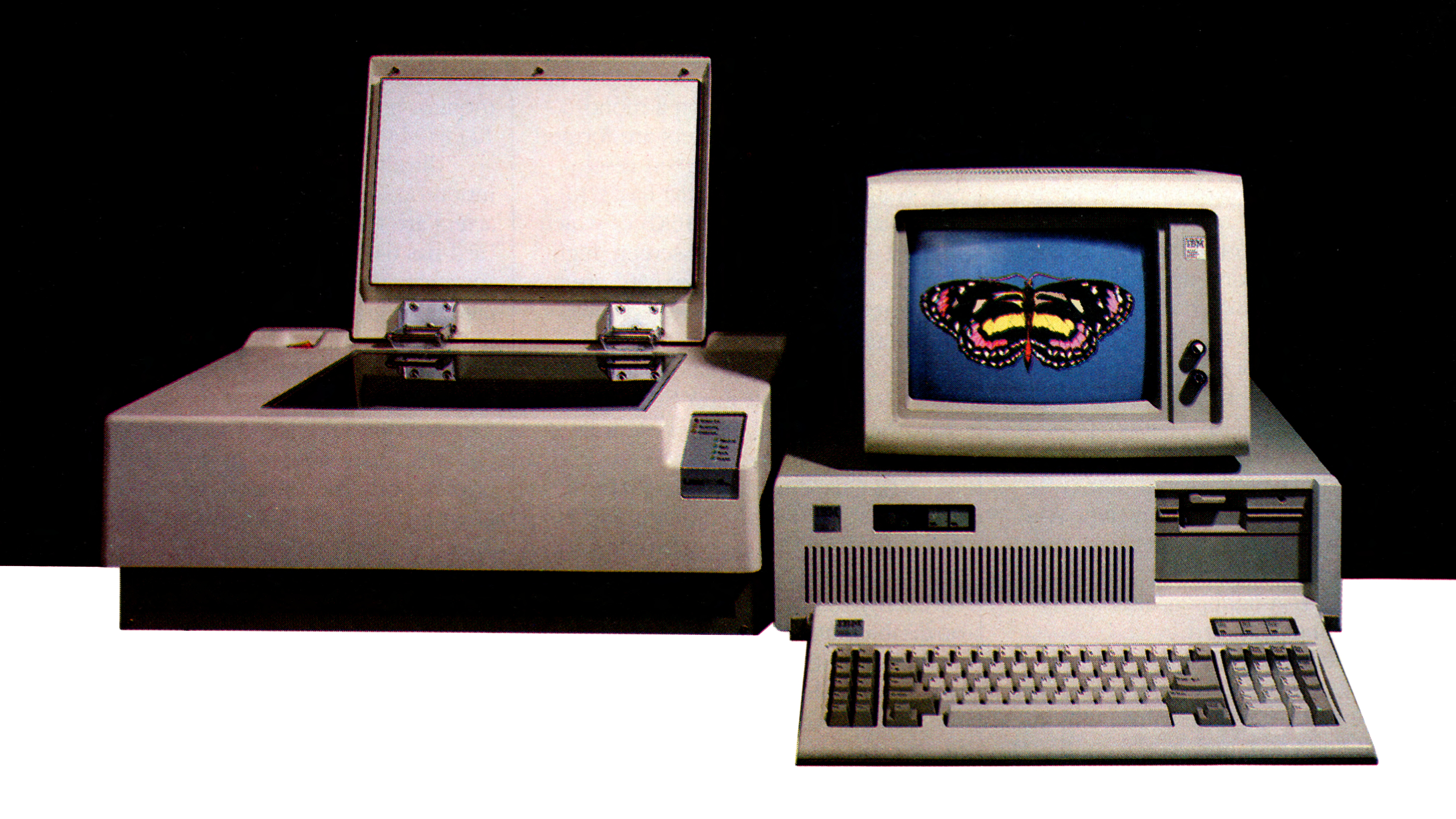
The SpectraSCAN was the first flatbed image scanner capable of scanning in color.

SpectraFAX Corporation was founded as LaserFAX Inc. in Naples, Florida, in around June 1984. Its founder was Robert Lee. The company was founded to develop small flatbed image scanners for personal computers. At this time, the desktop publishing revolution had yet to happen, and the only flatbed scanners that had been invented were extremely large and the exclusive domain of expensive commercial printing companies. While Datacopy already had a flatbed scanner for the IBM PC on the market by January 1985 with the Datacopy Model 700, it was only capable of scanning in 1-bit monochrome (black and white).

In March 1985 at COMDEX/Winter '85 in Anaheim, California, LaserFAX unveiled the SpectraSCAN, which was the first flatbed image scanner capable of scanning color, based on a charge-coupled device (CCD). The SpectraSCAN measured 10 by 25 by 15 inches (25 by 64 by 38 cm) and comprised six circuit boards inside. The scanner worked by placing color filters over the CCD and taking four passes (three for each primary color and one for black) per scan to build up a color reproduction. The SpectraSCAN 200 took between two and three minutes to produce a scan of a letter-sized print at 200-dpi. It was capable of processing and outputting images at 4-bit color, or 16 colors, making heavy use of dithering algorithms to eliminate color banding. LaserFAX also sold a grayscale counterpart, the DS-200, that took only 30 seconds to make a scan at the same size and resolution. Like the Datacopy Model 700, the SpectraSCAN and the DS-200 were compatible only with the IBM PC.

Both the SpectraSCAN and the DS-200 featured an internal expansion bus for added functionality. In spring 1985, LaserFAX debuted the TEXreader, an expansion card for their scanners which gave them the ability to parse text on the scanned documents via optical character recognition and output this information to the PC, as an alternative to storing the entire document on the computer, which was a very storage-intensive proposition, especially for contemporary hard drives. In July 1985, the company debuted the LaserFAXimile, another expansion card that allowed the scanners to function as a fax machine as well as an image scanner. LaserFAX introduced support for Apple's Macintosh platform in 1986.

By the end of 1985, LaserFAX Inc. had 16 employees in its Naples headquarters and a manufacturing plant in Orlando, Florida. Around this time, the company changed its name to SpectraFAX Corporation. It later also rebranded the SpectraSCAN as the SpectraFAX 200. Despite having the only relatively low-cost color scanner on the market by late 1987, the company's sales were disappointing. According to PC Magazine, the company had only sold around 200 units of the SpectraFAX 200 by October 1987. Lee left the company and was replaced as CEO by Thomas J. Conwell, who proceeded to pivot SpectraFAX's bottom line from image scanners to fax-to-PC hardware. This was prompted after he saw large crowds populate at booths advertising such hardware at COMDEX/Fall '86.

As a result of the company's poor scanner sales, the company had little cash flow to raise the capital to market its own fax-to-PC boards, so it formed a partnership with Panasonic of Japan to design such a board for Panasonic to market under their own name in exchange for royalties. Panasonic's product, dubbed the Fax Partner, proved commercially successful and spurred the development of original products within SpectraFAX. By 1989, SpectraFAX was selling specialized fax hardware under its own name; it was also still selling flatbed scanners. By the end of 1992, SpectraFAX generated over $5 million in revenue and had inked licensing deals with other large companies, including Intel and ROLM.

In 1995, SpectraFAX entered the Internet fax service business, providing both fax broadcast and fax-on-demand services to individuals or corporations. The former service allowed users to send faxes to a large list of recipients en masse, while the latter allowed companies to have certain documents available to the general public via a recorded voice menu provided by a toll-free number operated by SpectraFAX. The voice menu allowed end users to select and receive specific documents that the company made available. In December 1996, SpectraFAX began providing the software behind their Internet fax infrastructure as Fax Liaison for Windows NT 4.0.

In April 2002, SpectraFAX was acquired by DFI Communications, owners of the data management software company Cleo Communications. The division was later renamed Streem Communications.
