= Data Disc =

Defunct American data storage company

Amcomp, Inc.
- Formerly: Data Disc, Incorporated (1962–1976)
- Type: Public
- Industry: Computer
- Founded: February 1962; 64 years ago in Palo Alto, California, United States
- Founders: Armin Miller; Daniel Teichroew
- Defunct: March 1977; 49 years ago
- Fate: Acquired by Datapoint

Data Disc, Incorporated, was a public American computer hardware company active from 1962 to 1977 and based in Silicon Valley. The company primarily manufactured hard disk drive units for mainframes and minicomputers. The company also manufactured specialized analog hard disk drives that stored video information for scientific organizations such as NASA as well as the television industry. Data Disc also produced graphical terminals and data tape drives, the latter under their subsidiary Bright Industries, Inc.. In 1976, the company changed their name to Amcomp, Inc., and in 1977, they were acquired by Datapoint.

== History ==
Data Disc was founded in February 1962 in Palo Alto, California by Armin Miller and Daniel Teichroew. Miller had previously worked for the Ampex Corporation, where he developed the basis for modified frequency modulation (MFM), a line code for magnetic data recording that doubled the density and transfer rate of data of the earlier FM encoding scheme. For MFM (also known as Miller modulation code), he was awarded a patent in 1963. In 1965, by which the company employed 26 people, Data Disc moved their headquarters to the Stanford Industrial Park, occupying half of a 36,000-square-foot building formerly occupied by Lockheed. The company gradually expanded their presence to occupy the entire footprint of that building by the late 1960s.

At Data Disc, Miller developed the first low-mass, three-point-suspension read–write head that was later licensed to IBM and used in their influential Winchester drives. This allowed for the head to come into closer contact with the spinning disk, allowing for much higher linear densities than that of Data Disc's competition (3200 bpi versus 300 bpi of their 1960s competitors). With the thin-film, nickel-cobalt-plated platters that Data Disc was using at the time for their drive units, the drives could even be stopped and started arbitrarily, with the heads midway through the platter, without causing a head crash. Data Disc sold their read–write heads to other companies on an OEM basis; companies whose drives used particulate magnetic media instead of thin-film magnetic media often had to lubricate their drives with silicone oil to prevent the heads from sticking to the drives.

Two former Ampex engineers, Fred Pfost and Kurt Machein, joined Data Disc in the mid-1960s; outside of work, they developed the VDR-210CF, a device that could record analog video signals onto a hard disk. This allowed broadcasters to perform instant replays of sports events on the fly, with the ability to jog between frames, replay in slow motion, and pause on a still frame cleanly (the helical scanning heads of videotape decks usually could not perform such trick plays cleanly, and pausing could wear out the signal on the tape due to friction concentrated on one spot on the tape). This device was sold by Machein's company Machtronics and licensed to Data Disc for resale to broadcast entities. Data Disc developed a specialized version of their videodisc recorders for NASA, which were able to store RGB component video signals sequentially and convert them to composite video signals usable by broadcasters. Data Disc's system was used by NASA in 1969 during the Apollo 11 moon landings and the Mariner 6 and 7 missions to Mars. Another application-specific version of their videodisc recorders allowed physicians to make rapid X-rays without film development wait times. Data Disc formalized their video systems unit as a subsidiary in July 1969.

Following a corporate reorganization caused by a sudden doubling of production volume, Miller resigned as president of Data Disc in April 1969, while remaining on the board of directors. He was succeeded as president by William W. Stevens. Miller later went on to found Datacopy, a pioneering manufacturer of image scanners, in 1973. Data Disc expanded with regional sales offices across the United States in November 1969, and the company left Palo Alto for larger headquarters in Sunnyvale, California, in March 1971. Andrew W. O'Sullivan replaced Stevens as president the following July.

Data Disc filed its initial public offering in mid-1972. In June 1972, Data Disc acquired Bright Industries from Tracor of Austin, Texas, for 5,000 shares of Data Disc's stock, as well as $100,000 in cash. Bright, a maker of traditional data tape drives, was acquired to round out the company's roster of products and make them more enticing to Data Disc's hard drive customers, who often bought tape drives from competitors. Likewise, Data Disc expanded to the field of computer graphics with the release of the Anagraph graphical terminal in November 1972 and the 6600 system in December 1973. In June 1974, by which point the company employed 269 in total, Data Disc raised a 52,000-square-foot building across the street for Bright to occupy. By mid-1975, Data Disc's hard drive sales accounted for 55 percent of their revenues; meanwhile, sales of graphics terminal sales accounted for 15 percent; sales of Bright tape drives for 20 percent; and sales of videodiscs for 10 percent.

In September 1975, Sullivan was succeeded as president by James J. Woo, an 11-year veteran of IBM. One of his first acts as president was renaming Data Disc to Amcomp, Inc., in reflecting its focus away from disk drive units and toward other peripherals and complete computer systems. The name change was finalized in June 1976. In March 1977, Datapoint Corporation of San Antonio, Texas, acquired Amcomp for $2 million in a stock swap.
