= GammaLink =

Former American computer and software company

GammaLink Inc.
- Company type: Private
- Industry: Computer
- Founded: c. 1984; 41 years ago
- Founders: Hank Magnuski; Michael Lutz
- Defunct: June 1994; 31 years ago
- Fate: Acquired by Dialogic Corporation
- Products: GammaFax

GammaLink Inc. was an American computer hardware and software company founded in the 1980s in Sunnyvale, California, by Hank Magnuski and Michael Lutz. The company was the first to invent PC-to-fax communications technology, GammaFax.

GammaLink introduced GammaFax in 1985.

The company was sold to Dialogic Corporation in 1994, which in turn was bought by Intel. It was then bought by Eicon and subsequently acquired by Open Media Labs, which now functions as Dialogic Media Labs.
