= Minnesota Internet Users Essential Tool =

Internet application suite

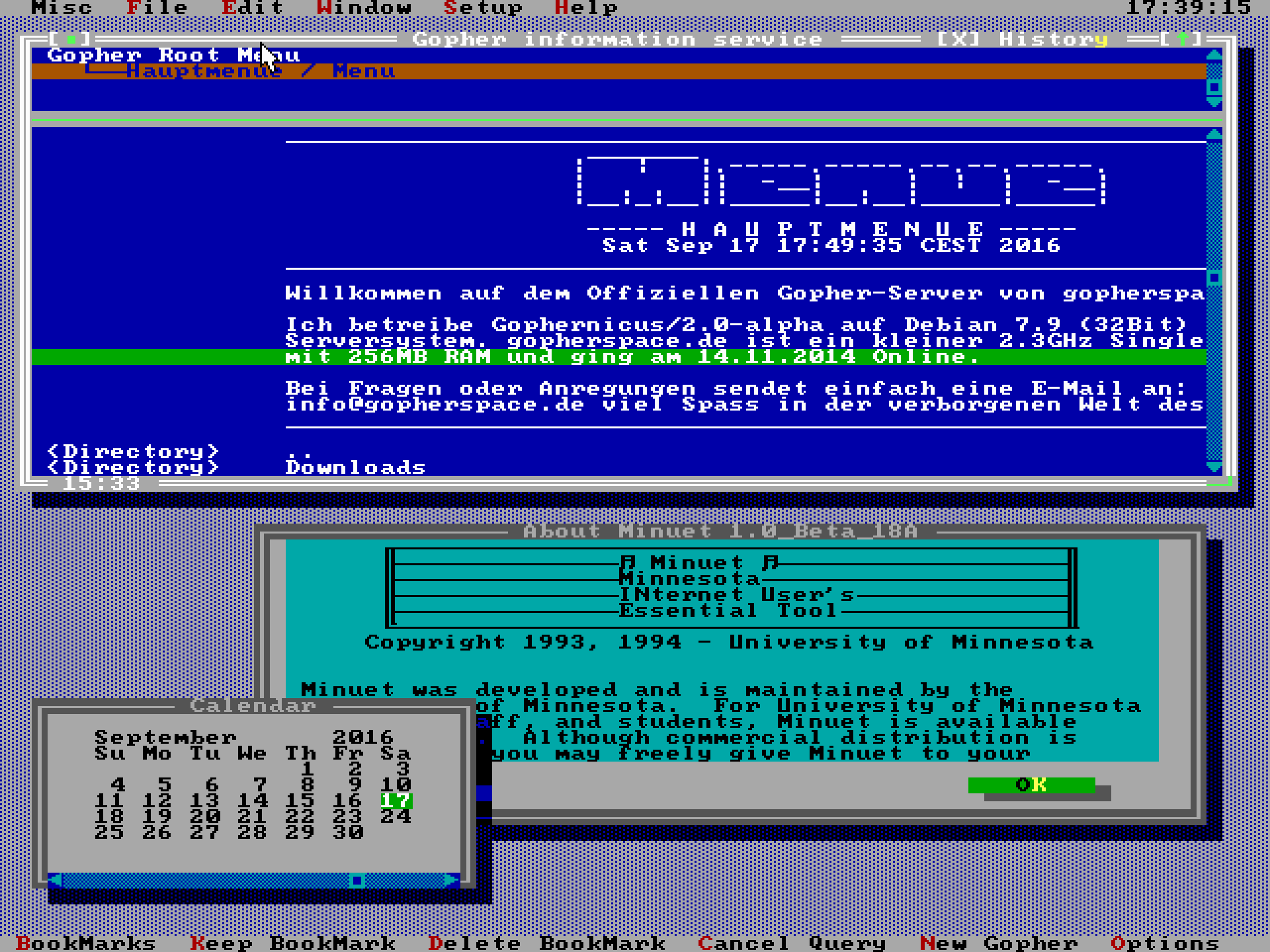
Screenshot of Minuet Version 1.0_BETA_18A

Minnesota Internet Users Essential Tool (Minuet) is an integrated Internet package for IBM PC compatibles running MS-DOS / PC DOS.

== Background ==
Minuet was created at the University of Minnesota, in the early days of the World Wide Web (1994–1996). At that time, Internet software for MS-DOS was immature — the only programs available were NCSA Telnet and NCSA FTP. Both are glitchy, hard to configure, and TTY-oriented.

The microcomputer support department at the university decided to come up with something better. Their design goals were:

- Runnable on any PC with at least 384 KiB of RAM, even an original 4.77 MHz PC.
- GUI interface
- Would run under DOS; not requiring Windows
- Easy to use
- Little or no configuration needed
- Multi-tasking

The result was "Minuet". Minuet was quite successful at its time, being used at many colleges and institutions. Its usage peaked around 1996, going down as Windows 95 and its free e-mail reader and web browser proliferated.

== Implementation ==
The program was written in Turbo Pascal, using the Turbo Vision GUI. This base is a good match for the PCs of that time. Turbo Vision in its early incarnations uses the 80×25 character text mode, meaning very speedy screen updates, even on slow PCs. Later Minuet versions - including the last one 1.0 Beta 18A - also support graphical modes up to 1600 × 1200 pixels (UXGA) while displaying up to 16.7 million colors, depending on the capabilities and VESA compatibility of the hardware used.

A homebrew multi-tasking kernel allows users to have several Minuet windows active at the same time. An FTP session could be transferring files, while in another window, the user could be composing an e-mail. All the parts of Minuet use multi-tasking, the user does not have to wait for a slow operation to complete.

== Features ==
=== Email ===
Email in Minuet resembles most standard email programs — From:, To:, cc:, Bcc:, and Message body fields. Attachments use the BinHex and UUCP encoding schemes, which predated MIME and were popular in Minuet's days.

=== Newsgroups ===
In Minuet, Newsgroups appear much like e-mail folders. An innovative concept is included — Minuet would not attempt to download the whole newsgroups file, which even then included thousands of newsgroups. Instead, a Perl server is contacted to search for interesting newsgroups. This cuts down the newsgroup searching startup time from many minutes to a few seconds.

=== Gopher ===
Minuet also comes with a built-in Gopher client.

=== FTP ===
Minuet is one of the first programs to have a graphical tree-structured approach to FTP. At the time, most FTP clients required an almost endless sequence of "cd", "ls" commands to browse servers.

=== Web browser ===
In its last version 1.0 Beta 18A from 1994, Minuet also includes a WWW browser for the first time. However, it is only HTTP/1.0-compliant, renders web sites in a pre-HTML 2.0 standard and therefore comes with no web form or table support. Later common web browser features such as JavaScript, CSS or proxy server support are not present in this version either. Enabling the graphical mode, however, allows Minuet to directly render GIF and JPEG images in HTML documents, which is a superior feature compared to other DOS-based WWW browsers of the time.

== SLIP ==
At that time most PC users connected to the internet using a modem, so a robust modem-capable driver was required. Unfortunately, SLIP drivers of the time were poor — hard to configure, difficult to test, missing important features like dialing, and often not using all of the buffering features of the serial port chips. Consequently, the Minuet team developed a SLIP driver and dial-up program.

== See also ==
- Lynx (text-based)
- Arachne (graphical)
