= Modprobe =

Linux program

modprobe is a Linux program that provides for loading a loadable kernel module into a Linux kernel, unloading a loaded module, and many other related features. It provides the ability to make decisions about which modules to load, awareness of module dependencies, so that when requested to load a module, it adds other required modules first, and resolution of recursive module dependencies.

It is commonly used indirectly. For example, udev relies upon modprobe to load drivers for automatically detected hardware.

Modprobe was originally written by Rusty Russell and is distributed as part of the software package "kmod" (maintained by Lucas De Marchi and others). It was previously developed as:

- "module-init-tools", for Linux kernel version 2.6 and later (maintained by Jon Masters and others)
- "modutils" for use with Linux versions 2.2.x and 2.4.x. .

== Operation ==
When invoked with no switches, the program adds/inserts/installs the module specified by name. Arguments after the module name are passed to the kernel. Configuration file options are also passed.

In some versions of modprobe, the configuration file is called modprobe.conf, and in others, the equivalent is the collection of files called <modulename> in the /etc/modprobe.d directory.

modprobe looks only in the standard module directories. To install modules from the working directory , insmod is required. Alternatively, a symbolic link file can be used so that depmod can find it.

Root privileges are typically required to perform the actions that modprobe attempts.

== Features ==
The modprobe program has more configuration features than other similar utilities. It is possible to define module aliases, allowing for some automatic loading of modules. When the kernel requires a module, it actually runs modprobe to request it; however, the kernel has a description of only some module properties (for example, a device major number or the number of a network protocol), and modprobe does the job of translating that to an actual module name via aliases.

The program also has the ability to run programs before or after loading or unloading a given module. For example, setting the mixer right after loading a sound card module, or uploading the firmware to a device immediately before enabling it. Although these actions must be implemented by external programs, modprobe synchronizes their execution with module loading/unloading.

== Blacklist ==
There are cases where two or more modules both support the same devices, or a module invalidly claims to support a device: the blacklist keyword indicates that all of a particular module's internal aliases are to be ignored.

There are a couple of ways to blacklist a module, and depending on the method used to load it depends on where this is configured.

There are two ways to blacklist a module using modprobe: employing the modprobe.conf system, the first is to use its blacklisting system in /etc/modprobe.d/. Any filename ending with .conf can be used:

cat /etc/modprobe.d/blacklist.conf
blacklist ieee1394
blacklist ohci1394
blacklist eth1394
blacklist sbp2

An install primitive is the highest priority in the config file and will be used instead of the blacklisting method above, requiring this second method:

cat /etc/modprobe.d/ieee1394.conf
install ieee1394 /bin/true
install ohci1394 /bin/true
install eth1394 /bin/true
install sbp2 /bin/true

Alternatively, you can modify /etc/modprobe.conf:

alias sub_module /dev/null 
alias module_main /dev/null 
options module_main needed_option=0

== See also ==
- lsmod – Linux command that lists loaded kernel modules
