= Helix HeadRoom =

HeadRoom is a DOS context switching and multitasking memory manager produced by Helix Software Company in the late 1980s and early 1990s. HeadRoom managed multiple terminate-and-stay-resident programs (TSRs) and was the first TSR manager to allow sharing of address space and interrupts among TSRs in DOS. HeadRoom v1.0 was released in September 1988.

In April 1989, Helix Software released HeadRoom v1.1 together with the "HeadRoom Network Extensions." This version added support for network communications processes. The HeadRoom Network Extensions intercepted and buffered NETBIOS and TCP/IP communications requests, allowing HeadRoom to manage network communications software such as mainframe Terminal Emulators and e-mail programs. The background communications of these programs would continue while the programs were swapped out. HeadRoom would reactivate the swapped-out programs when activity occurred on the NETBIOS or TCP/IP sockets.

In October 1989, Helix Software released HeadRoom v2.0 which included support for Microsoft Windows and LIM EMS v4.0. Starting in March 1990, this version of HeadRoom was bundled with AST Research RAMpage, RAMpage Plus and SixPack memory expansion boards.

In June 1990, Helix Software licensed technology from Headroom to Digital Communications Associates for use with their IRMA boards and IRMALan software.

In January 1991, Helix released the final version of Headroom, v2.03 and thereafter incorporated HeadRoom's features into its Netroom LAN memory manager, a decision which caused market confusion.
