= Helix Software Company =

American software company (1986–1997)

Helix Software Company, Inc.
- Type: Private
- Industry: Software
- Founded: October 1986; 40 years ago
- Founder: Michael Spilo
- Headquarters: Long Island City, New York, U.S.
- Area served: Worldwide

Helix Software Company, Inc. was a New York City based software company founded in October 1986. The company developed software tools and utilities for DOS and Windows. In 1993, Helix licensed some of its memory management technology to Microsoft for use in MS-DOS 6.0. Microsoft subsequently released Helix's memory management technology as part of the MEMMAKER and EMM386 DOS commands.

The company pioneered several technologies, including virtual memory compression systems, switching between multiple protected mode operating environments, use of off-screen video RAM, and highly recoverable fixed storage systems.

On 1 December 1997, Helix Software merged with McAfee, Network General, and PGP Corporation in a pooling of interest transaction, the resulting company was named Network Associates. Helix's products were integrated with the other companies' products as well as with products from the subsequent acquisitions of Cybermedia and Dr Solomon's Antivirus. The combined products were branded McAfee Office and McAfee Security Suite.

== Notable products ==
DOS/Windows memory management:

- HeadRoom
- NETROOM
- Cloaking, Multimedia Cloaking, Cloaking Developer's Toolkit
- Helix Multimedia Stacker

Windows performance enhancement:

- Hurricane virtual memory compressor^{†}

Nuts & Bolts and related Windows tools:

- DiskTune hard drive optimization
- DiskMinder hard drive repair
- Stronghold encryption
- Safe & Sound automatic backup and recovery

^†Nuts & Bolts Deluxe and Platinum included Hurricane as part of its utilities suite after the McAfee buyout.

== See also ==
- Tech companies in the New York metropolitan area
