= EMS Technologies =

EMS Technologies, Inc.
- Company type: Subsidiary
- Traded as: Nasdaq: ELMG
- Industry: Communications Technologies
- Founded: 1968; 58 years ago, in Peachtree Corners, Georgia
- Defunct: 2011 (acquired by Honeywell)
- Headquarters: Peachtree Corners, Georgia, Ottawa, Ontario
- Key people: Dr. Neil A. Mackay (president and CEO)
- Products: Microwave Communication Devices, Mobile Broadband, Mobile computing Satellite Internet access and Military communications
- Revenue: $287.88 million US
- Operating income: $19.3 million US
- Net income: $18.7 million US
- Number of employees: 1,900 (2007)
- Parent: Honeywell
- Website: www.ems-t.com

EMS Technologies, Inc. was an Atlanta-based company with approximately $290 million in annual sales revenue before its 2011 purchase by Honeywell International. EMS-T specialized in wireless, defense, and space communications systems.

== History ==
Founded in 1968 by Dr. John E. Pippin (1928–2007) as Electromagnetic Sciences Inc., the company was located in the Peachtree Corners Technology Park and employed about 1,100 there and 1,900 internationally. In 2007, EMS had its best financial results of its 40-year history, acquiring two companies, DSpace of Australia, and Akerstroms of Sweden, and earning a listing on Forbes magazine's list of the 200 best small companies. Among its products, it offered electronic counter-countermeasures for communications satellites, and airborne communications, for which it held a 90% stake in military applications, such as Air Force One.

EMS was purchased by Honeywell International in August 2011.

== Divisions ==
The company had four major divisions: EMS Defense & Space, LXE, EMS Aviation and EMS Global Tracking.

=== EMS Defense & Space ===
EMS Defense & Space manufactured Kband antenna systems and custom beam management systems for military and commercial applications, including mobile network-centric operations, radar for battlefield visibility and commercial aero connectivity.

=== EMS Global Tracking ===
EMS Global Tracking manufactured vehicle and personal tracking systems for transportation, security, maritime and the oil and gas industries. This division helped companies locate, track and communicate with mobile assets, safeguard their fleets, cargo.

=== EMS Aviation ===
EMS Aviation manufactured satellite-based communication systems that enable worldwide high-speed Internet, voice and video capabilities in-flight. This division's systems are used for in-flight communications and entertainment, rugged data storage, airborne connectivity, and data recording and replay hardware and software for the aerospace, defense and transportation industries.

=== LXE ===
LXE manufactured rugged vehicle-mounted, handheld and wearable mobile computers. This division's warehouse products helped companies extend corporate networks to mobile workers with hand held scanners and computers.
