= Eicon =

Business enterprise

Eicon Networks Corporation
- Logo of Eicon Technology
- Formerly: Eicon Technology Corporation
- Company type: Private
- Industry: Telecommunication
- Founded: October 12, 1984; 41 years ago
- Headquarters: Montreal, Quebec, Canada
- Website: www.dialogic.com

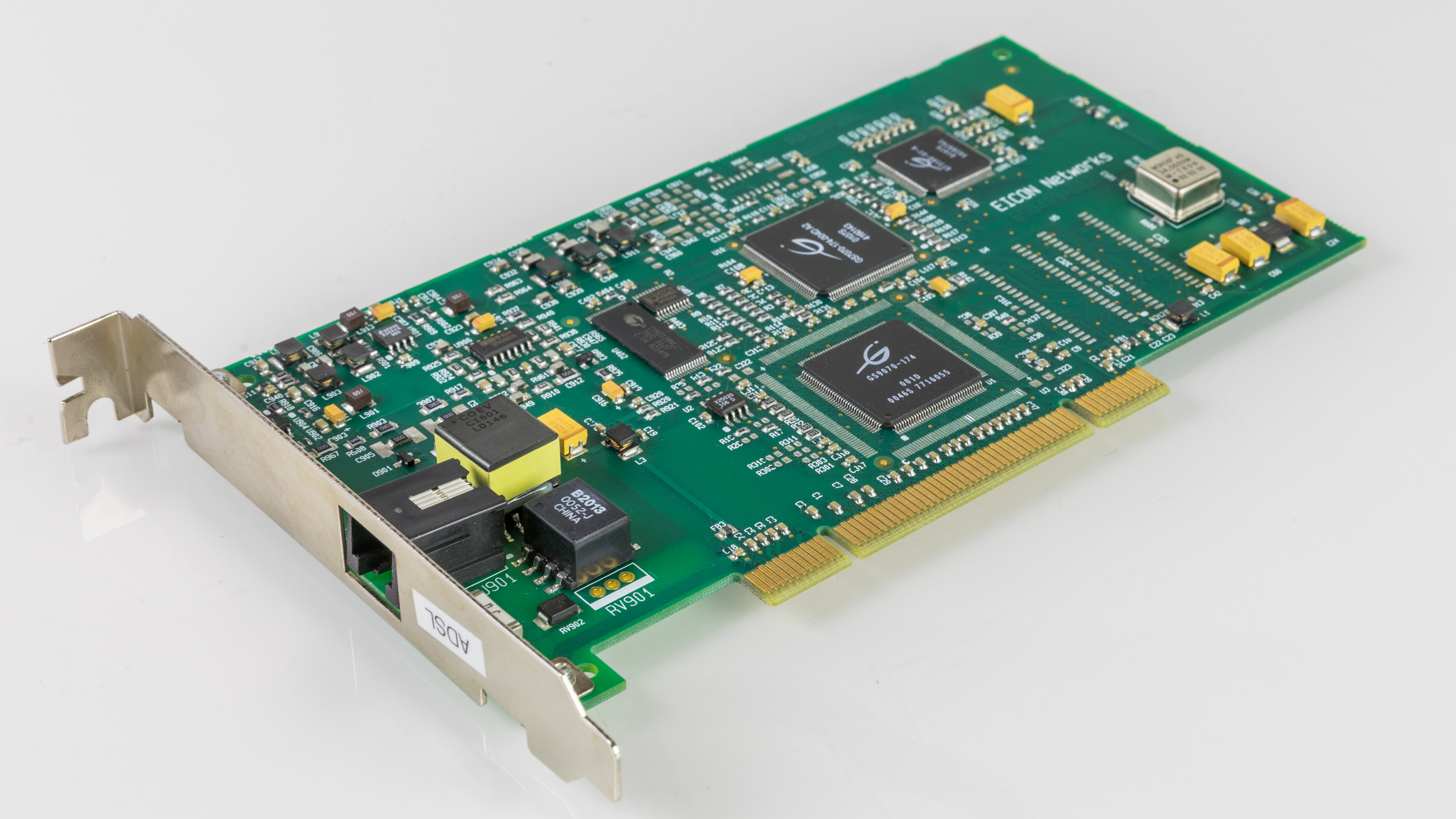
Eicon ADSL card

Eicon Networks Corporation, formerly Eicon Technology Corporation, is a privately owned designer, developer and manufacturer of communication products founded on October 12, 1984, with headquarters in Montreal, Quebec, Canada. Eicon products are sold worldwide through a large network of distributors and resellers, and supplied to OEMs.

In October 2006, Eicon purchased the Media & Signalling Division of Intel, known as Dialogic before its purchase by Intel in 1999, which produces telephony boards for PC servers. The combined Eicon/Dialogic company changed its name to Dialogic Corporation at the time of the purchase. It is meanwhile known as Dialogic Inc.

== Products ==
Eicon's products include the Diva Family (Diva Server and Diva Client) and Eiconcard product lines.

=== Diva Server ===
Diva Server is a range of telecoms products for voice, speech, conferencing and fax. It supports T1/E1; SS7; ISDN and conventional phone line (PSTN). As of 2008 Eicon Host Media Processing products, "software adapters" that provide VoIP capability for applications, are available.

Diva Server is used in VoiceXML speech servers; SMS gateways; fax and unified messaging and call recording and monitoring.

=== Diva Client ===
Diva products are connectivity products for remote access for the home and for remote and mobile workers. They are mostly ISDN or combined ISDN and dialup modems. In the past Eicon produced ADSL and Wi-Fi equipment, but these areas have become dominated by far-eastern manufacturers.

=== Eiconcard ===
The Eiconcard connects legacy X.25 systems for tasks such as credit card authorization, SMS, and satellite communications. The Eiconcard has been produced since the company was founded in 1984, and continues to be available. Eicon cards with their flexible protocol stacks were also used as a flexible communications gateway to IBM's midrange and mainframe computers and for a time occupied a niche market allowing Ethernet based PC networks to utilise IBM's LU6.2 (intelligent) communications router without having to use Token Ring.

== Graphics Products ==
Eicon has also produced graphics products alongside its core communications business.

=== Eiconscript ===
Eiconscript was a PostScript printing solution which used a laser 'print engine' connected to an intelligent adapter installed inside a PC. The adapter card ran an Eicon developed implementation of the PostScript language.

=== Eiconjet ===
Eiconjet was a laser printing solution using a design and hardware similar to Eiconscript. Rather than PostScript, it executed the Hewlett-Packard PCL5 (Printer Command Language). The Eiconjet software was also developed in-house as a Clean Room design.

== See also ==
- Dialogic Inc.
- DOS Protected Mode Services for Eicon DIVA ISDN drivers
