= Open Data-Link Interface =

The Open Data-Link Interface (ODI) is an application programming interface (API) for network interface controllers (NICs) developed by Apple and Novell. The API serves the same function as Microsoft and 3COM's Network Driver Interface Specification (NDIS). Originally, ODI was written for NetWare and Macintosh environments. Like NDIS, ODI provides rules that establish a vendor-neutral interface between the protocol stack and the adapter driver. It resides in Layer 2, the Data Link layer, of the OSI model. This interface also enables one or more network drivers to support one or more protocol stacks.

== See also ==
- Uniform Driver Interface (UDI)
- Universal Network Device Interface (UNDI)
- PC/TCP Packet Driver
- Virtual Loadable Module (VLM)
- NetWare I/O Subsystem (NIOS)
- Personal NetWare (PNW)
- DR-WebSpyder
