= Self-relocation =

Program that relocates its own address-dependent instructions and data when run

In computer programming, a self-relocating program is a program that relocates its own address-dependent instructions and data when run, and is therefore capable of being loaded into memory at any address. In many cases, self-relocating code is also a form of self-modifying code.

== Overview ==
Self-relocation is similar to the relocation process employed by the linker-loader when a program is copied from external storage into main memory; the difference is that it is the loaded program itself rather than the loader in the operating system or shell that performs the relocation.

One form of self-relocation occurs when a program copies the code of its instructions from one sequence of locations to another sequence of locations within the main memory of a single computer, and then transfers processor control from the instructions found at the source locations of memory to the instructions found at the destination locations of memory. As such, the data operated upon by the algorithm of the program is the sequence of bytes which define the program.

Static self-relocation typically happens at load-time (after the operating system has loaded the software and passed control to it, but still before its initialization has finished), sometimes also when changing the program's configuration at a later stage during runtime.

== Examples ==
=== Boot loaders ===
As an example, self-relocation is often employed in the early stages of bootstrapping operating systems on architectures like IBM PC compatibles, where lower-level chain boot loaders (like the master boot record (MBR), volume boot record (VBR) and initial boot stages of operating systems such as DOS) move themselves out of place in order to load the next stage into memory.

=== CP/M extensions ===
Under CP/M, the debugger Dynamic Debugging Tool (DDT) dynamically relocated itself to the top of available memory through page boundary relocation in order to maximize the Transient Program Area (TPA) for programs to run in.

In 1988, the alternative command line processor ZCPR 3.4 for the Z-System introduced so called type-4 programs which were self-relocatable through an embedded stub as well.

=== x86 DOS drivers ===
Under DOS, self-relocation is sometimes also used by more advanced drivers and resident system extensions (RSXs) or terminate-and-stay-resident programs (TSRs) loading themselves "high" into upper memory more effectively than possible for externally provided "high"-loaders (like LOADHIGH/HILOAD, INSTALLHIGH/HIINSTALL or DEVICEHIGH/HIDEVICE etc. since DOS 5) in order to maximize the memory available for applications. This is down to the fact that the operating system has no knowledge of the inner workings of a driver to be loaded and thus has to load it into a free memory area large enough to hold the whole driver as a block including its initialization code, even if that would be freed after the initialization. For TSRs, the operating system also has to allocate a Program Segment Prefix (PSP) and an environment segment. This might cause the driver not to be loaded into the most suitable free memory area or even prevent it from being loaded high at all. In contrast to this, a self-relocating driver can be loaded anywhere (including into conventional memory) and then relocate only its (typically much smaller) resident portion into a suitable free memory area in upper memory. In addition, advanced self-relocating TSRs (even if already loaded into upper memory by the operating system) can relocate over most of their own PSP segment and command line buffer and free their environment segment in order to further reduce the resulting memory footprint and avoid fragmentation. Some self-relocating TSRs can also dynamically change their "nature" and morph into device drivers even if originally loaded as TSRs, thereby typically also freeing some memory. Finally, it is technically impossible for an external loader to relocate drivers into expanded memory (EMS), the high memory area (HMA) or extended memory (via DPMS or CLOAKING), because these methods require small driver-specific stubs to remain in conventional or upper memory in order to coordinate the access to the relocation target area, (Note: An exception to the requirement for a stub is when expanded memory is converted into permanent upper memory by the memory manager via EMSUMB, and thus it is effectively accessed as upper memory, not via EMS.) (Note: There are two exceptions to the stub requirement for a driver to load into the HMA: A stub is not necessary when high memory is permanently enabled on machines without gate A20 logic, however, as this condition isn't met in general, generic DOS drivers cannot take advantage of it (unless they would explicitly test on this condition beforehand). Otherwise, a stub is also not necessary under DR DOS 6.0 and higher, when resident system extensions (like SHARE and NLSFUNC) only hook the multiplex interrupt INT 2Fh, because they can then utilize a backdoor interface to hook into the interrupt chain in kernel space so that the kernel's gate A20 handler will provide the functionality of the stub.^{[a]} Still, the driver has to perform self-relocation in order to function correctly in the HMA.) and in the case of device drivers also because the driver's header must always remain in the first megabyte. In order to achieve this, the drivers must be specially designed to support self-relocation into these areas.

Some advanced DOS drivers also contain both a device driver (which would be loaded at offset +0000h by the operating system) and TSR (loaded at offset +0100h) sharing a common code portion internally as fat binary. If the shared code is not designed to be position-independent, it requires some form of internal address fix-up similar to what would otherwise have been carried out by a relocating loader already; this is similar to the fix-up stage of self-relocation but with the code already being loaded at the target location by the operating system's loader (instead of done by the driver itself).

=== IBM DOS/360 and OS/360 programs ===
IBM DOS/360 did not have the ability to relocate programs during loading. Sometimes multiple versions of a program were maintained, each built for a different load address (partition). A special class of programs, called self-relocating programs, were coded to relocate themselves after loading. IBM OS/360 relocated executable programs when they were loaded into memory. Only one copy of the program was required, but once loaded the program could not be moved (so called one-time position-independent code).

=== Other examples ===
As an extreme example of (many-time) self-relocation, also called dynamic self-relocation, it is possible to construct a computer program so that it does not stay at a fixed address in memory, even as it executes, as for example used in worm memory tests. The Apple Worm is a dynamic self-relocator as well.

== See also ==
- Dynamic dead-code elimination
- RPLOADER – a DR-DOS API to assist remote/network boot code in relocating itself while DOS boots
- Garbage collection
- Self-replication
- Self-reference
- Quine (computing)
