= Dialogic Group =

Business enterprise

Dialogic Group, Inc.
- Type: Private
- Industry: Telecommunication
- Founded: 1983; 43 years ago
- Headquarters: 4 Gatehill Drive; Parsippany, New Jersey, U.S. 07054; 39°28′39″N 75°20′16″W
- Area served: Worldwide
- Products: Media servers Real-time communications applications Unified communications platform Application ochestration Session border controllers Signaling stacks and software Real-time communications load balancers Softswitches; Media gateways Bandwidth optimization Fax boards FoIP software
- Website: www.dialogic.com

Dialogic Group, Inc., formerly Dialogic Corporation, was an American multinational technology company headquartered in Parsippany, New Jersey, United States. Prior to its acquisition by Enghouse Systems of Ontario in 2020, it had operations in over 25 countries. Dialogic provided a cloud-optimized communications technology for real-time communications media, applications, and infrastructure to service providers, enterprises, and developers.

== History ==
Dialogic was founded in 1983 in Parsippany, New Jersey by three engineers, Nicholas Zwick and James Shinn, both of whom had worked for Advanced Micro Devices, and Kenneth Burkhardt, formerly with Unisys. In 1999, at the height of the dot-com era, the company was acquired by Intel for $780 million and was run as the Media & Signaling Division. In October 2006, Eicon bought the Media & Signaling Division of Intel and then changed its name back to Dialogic.

Since the formation of the new Dialogic, other competitors in the same industry have been acquired and merged into the company, including NMS Communications and Cantata. The latter was itself a collection of companies including Brooktrout, Inc., and the Excel Switching Corporation.

In May 2010, Dialogic announced a merger with San Jose, California-based Veraz Networks, a company specializing in softswitch and compression technology. The resulting company would retain the name Dialogic. That same year, Dialogic moved its headquarters to Milpitas, California.

On November 24, 2014, Dialogic was acquired by Novacap TMT IV, L.P., a Canadian private equity firm. They moved the headquarters back to Parsippany, New Jersey.

On February 9, 2016, Dialogic Corp announced the completed acquisition of Apex Communications, a supplier of global real-time communications applications for service providers and enterprise networks. The company launched an application development practice for networked, premises and cloud-based applications. The line of applications include WebRTC, unified communications, IVR, on-demand voicemail and cloud-based PBX.

On January 9, 2018, Sangoma Technologies Corporation acquired all key assets of the Converged Communication Division (CCD) from Dialogic Corporation. By divesting its CCD hardware business, Dialogic became a software-centric company.

The remaining company, under the name Dialogic Group, was acquired on January 2, 2020, by Enghouse Systems Ltd of Markham, Ontario.

== Products ==
Dialogic designed, sold and supported real-time communications media, applications, and infrastructure services to communications service providers, enterprises, and developers.

Its products included media servers, gateways and boards; load balancers, communications applications, softswitches, diameter signaling controllers, session border controllers, signaling stacks and software, fax boards and FoIP software, and bandwidth optimization services.
