= OzEmail =

Early Australian internet service provider

OzEmail Limited
- Traded as: OZM
- Founder: Sean Howard
- Defunct: 2005
- Fate: Acquired by iiNet
- Key people: Sean Howard; Justin Milne; Malcolm Turnbull
- Website: ozemail.com.au at the Wayback Machine (archived 2000-11-09)

OzEmail Pty Limited was a major Internet service provider (ISP) in Australia, until it was acquired by iiNet on 28 February 2005.

== History ==
In the early 1980s, Sean Howard was the editor of the Australian Personal Computer magazine and subsequently founded Microtex 666, the largest service provider on Telecom Australia's Viatel service. In 1992, he sold his share of Computer Publications to Australian Consolidated Press and founded pioneering email service Oz-E-mail. At this time, OzEmail had eight staff members and was creating a system to integrate Lotus cc:Mail, MicrosoftMail and Novell MHS Mail systems. The initial network consisted of 16 POPs around Australia.

In 1994 businessmen Malcolm Turnbull and Trevor Kennedy invested and the business was relaunched as internet service provider OzEmail.

On 28 May 1996, OzEmail became the first Australian tech stock ever to list on the NASDAQ. With the trading symbol OZEMY, over A$50 million in investment capital was raised. Two years later, OzEmail listed on the Australian Securities Exchange (ASX) with the symbol OZM.

Also in 1996, OzEmail was the unsuccessful respondent in a case involving the creators of Trumpet Winsock, regarding intellectual property and trade practices matters . The court found that Sean Howard was "closely involved in all stages of the project". At the time this distribution occurred in 1995, Trumpet Winsock 2.0B was commonly distributed by ISPs without properly licensing it. The lawsuit alleged that OzEmail deliberately removed reference to the fact that it was shareware and required registration. Trumpet Winsock 2.1 was the first timelocked version, released in July 1995. This was too late for OzEmail, which went ahead and distributed the 2.0B version without permission, before 2.1 was released, but it did have a draft README mentioning that the new version would be time-locked to 30 days and then need to be registered. That was also just before Windows 95 was released, which has built-in TCP/IP support. Trumpet Winsock 2.1 would not work with Win32 Winsock applications.

Through 1997 and 1998, OzEmail grew at a rapid rate through acquisitions and aggressive growth, while competing with some 850 ISPs. On 14 December 1998, WorldCom (later MCI) launched a takeover bid. On 24 February 1999, it became the 100% owner of OzEmail, removing OzEmail from the NASDAQ and ASX. OzEmail continued its previous strategy of acquiring other companies. Malcolm Turnbull, who later became the Australian Prime Minister, was then chairman of OzEmail. He had purchased a stake in OzEmail in 1994 for $500,000 and sold his stake for $57 million in 1999 to WorldCom.

Perth based ISP iiNet purchased the assets of OzEmail on 28 February 2005 and started trading under the new name iiNet (OzEmail) Pty Ltd. Use of the OzEmail brand name was discontinued. Although existing customers kept their OzEmail usernames, new customers were signed up under the iiNet brand.

== Voyager Internet ==
In 1995, OzEmail established a New Zealand offshoot, Voyager Internet, and was one of the first Internet providers in the country to go nationwide. Following the WorldCom scandal and its subsequent pulling out of consumer Internet services, by 2002 its customer base had been largely acquired by Telecom New Zealand's Xtra.
