= Layered Service Provider =

Feature of Microsoft Windows Winsock

Layered Service Provider (LSP) is a deprecated feature of the Microsoft Windows Winsock 2 Service Provider Interface (SPI). A Layered Service Provider is a DLL that uses Winsock APIs to attempt to insert itself into the TCP/IP protocol stack. Once in the stack, a Layered Service Provider can intercept and modify inbound and outbound Internet traffic. It allows processing of all the TCP/IP traffic taking place between the Internet and the applications that are accessing the Internet (such as a web browser, the email client, etc.). For example, it could be used by malware to redirect web browers to rogue websites, or to block access to sites like Windows Update. Alternatively, a computer security program could scan network traffic for viruses or other threats. The Winsock Service Provider Interface (SPI) API provides a mechanism for layering providers on top of each other. Winsock LSPs are available for a range of useful purposes, including parental controls and Web content filtering. The parental controls web filter in Windows Vista is an LSP. The layering order of all providers is kept in the Winsock Catalog.

== Details ==
Unlike the well-known Winsock 2 API, which is covered by numerous books, documentation, and samples, the Winsock 2 SPI is relatively unexplored. The Winsock 2 SPI is implemented by network transport service providers and namespace resolution service providers. The Winsock 2 SPI can be used to extend an existing transport service provider by implementing a Layered Service Provider. For example, quality of service (QoS) on Windows 98 and Windows 2000 is implemented as an LSP over the TCP/IP protocol stack. Another use for LSPs would be to develop specialized URL filtering software to prevent Web browsers from accessing certain sites, regardless of the browser installed on a desktop. The Winsock 2 SPI allows software developers to create two different types of service providers—transport and namespace. Transport providers (commonly referred to as protocol stacks) are services, which supply functions that set up connections, transfer data, exercise flow control, error control, and so on. Namespace providers are services that associate the addressing attributes of a network protocol with one or more human-friendly names and enable protocol-independent name resolution. The SPI also allows you to develop two types of transport service providers—base and layered service providers.

Base service providers implement the actual details of a transport protocol: setting up connections, transferring data, and exercising flow control and error control. Layered service providers implement only higher-level custom communication functions and rely on an existing underlying base provider for the actual data exchange with a remote endpoint.

Winsock 2 LSPs are implemented as Windows DLLs with a single exported entry function, WSPStartup. All other transport SPI functions are made accessible to ws2_32.dll or an upper chain layered provider via the LSP's dispatch table. LSPs and base providers are strung together to form a protocol chain. The LSP DLL has to be registered using a special LSP registrant which instructs Winsock 2, the loading order of the LSPs (there can be more than one LSP installed) and which protocols to intercept.

LSPs work by intercepting Winsock 2 commands before they are processed by ws2_32.dll; they can therefore modify the commands, drop a command, or just log the data which makes them a useful tool for malware, network filters, network intercepters, and stream based sniffers. Sniffing network traffic through LSP can sometimes be troublesome since anti-virus vendors typically flag such activity as malicious — a network packet analyzer is therefore a better alternative for capturing network traffic.

A feature of LSP and Winsock proxy sniffing is that they allow traffic to be captured from a single application and also enable traffic going to localhost (127.0.0.1) to be sniffed on Windows.

There are two kinds of LSP: IFS and non IFS LSP. Currently most LSPs on the market are non IFS. The difference between the two LSPs is that non IFS LSPs modify the socket handle to a non valid Windows IFS handle and therefore the LSP must implement all Winsock 2 methods. IFS LSPs, on the other hand, preserve the socket handle, which allows the LSP to implement only the functions it wants to intercept. IFS LSPs have much less performance impact than non IFS LPS, but they are limited by the fact that they cannot inspect or modify data on the receive path.

== Deprecation and LSP bypass ==
LSPs have been deprecated since Windows Server 2012. Systems that include LSPs will not pass the Windows logo checks. Windows 8 style "metro" apps that use networking will automatically bypass all LSPs. The Windows Filtering Platform provides similar functionality and is compatible with both Windows 8 style "metro" apps and conventional desktop applications.

== Corruption issues ==
A major issue with LSPs is that any bugs in the LSP can cause applications to break. For example, an LSP that returns the wrong number of bytes sent through an interface can cause applications to go into an infinite loop while waiting for the network stack to indicate that data has been sent.

Another major common issue with LSPs was that if they were to be removed or unregistered improperly or if the LSP was buggy, it would result in corruption of the Winsock catalog in the registry, and the entire TCP/IP stack would break and the computer could no longer access the network.

LSP technology is often exploited by spyware and adware programs in order to intercept the communication across the Internet. For example, malware may insert itself as an LSP in the network stack and forward all of the user's traffic to an unauthorized external site, where it can be data-mined to find the user's interests to bombard him/her with targeted advertisements, as well as spam e-mail. If a malware LSP is not removed correctly, older versions of Windows may be left without a working network connection.

Such potential loss of all network connectivity is prevented in Windows XP Service Pack 2, Windows Server 2003 Service Pack 1 and all later Windows operating systems, in which Winsock has the ability to self-heal after a user uninstalls such an LSP.

Installed LSPs can be viewed using the XP/Vista Windows Defender's Software Explorer or using third-party utilities.
