= GGC =

GGC may refer to:

- Cargo 360, a defunct American cargo airline
- Gandhara grave culture
- Gangapur City railway station, in Rajasthan, India
- Gemini Guidance Computer, used in NASA's Project Gemini
- Georgia Gulf Corporation, now Axiall, an American chemical company
- Georgia Gwinnett College, in Lawrenceville, Georgia, United States
- Gibson Guitar Corporation, an American guitar manufacturer
- Girl Guides of Canada
- GGC, a codon for the amino acid glycine
- Gotland Game Conference
- Governor General of Canada
- Grand and General Council, of San Marino
- Lumbala Airport, in Angola
- NHS Greater Glasgow and Clyde, a health board in Scotland
- Graduates' General Congress, a Sudanese independence movement (1938–1943)
- Great Galactic Conflict, an Australian online game
