= Longene =

Linux kernel fork for Windows compatibility

Linux Unified Kernel
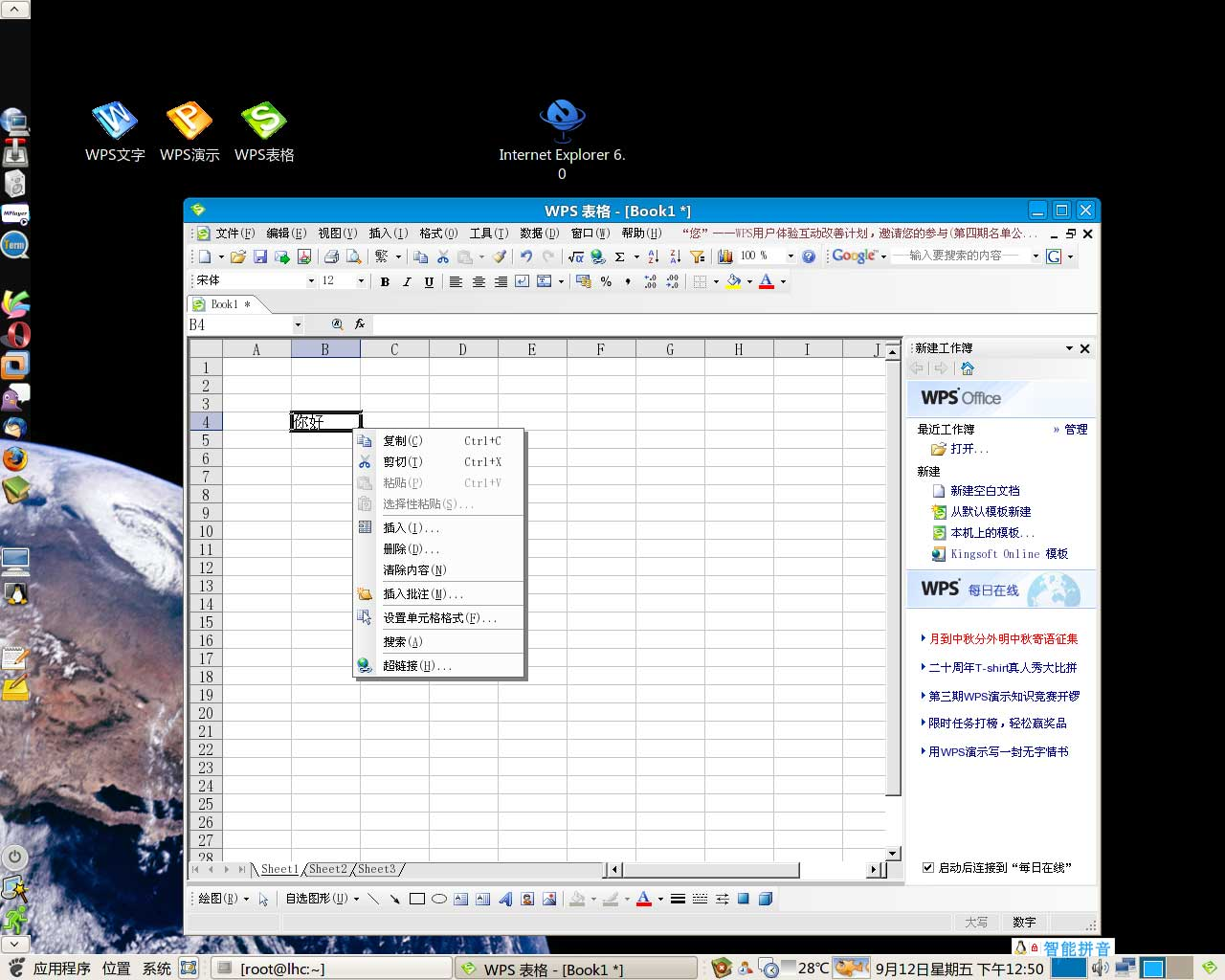
- Longene 0.2.1
- Developer: Insigma Technology
- Written in: C
- OS family: Linux with Windows-like additions
- Working state: Inactive, last update in 2014
- Source model: Open source
- Latest preview: 1.0-rc2 / January 16, 2014; 12 years ago
- Repository: github.com/longene-archive/longene-1.0-rc2
- Marketing target: Personal computing
- Available in: Multilingual
- Supported platforms: IA-32, x86-64
- Kernel type: Monolithic (derived from Linux)
- License: GNU GPL v2
- Official website: http://www.longene.org/en/index.php (archived)

Longene (Chinese: 龙井) is a Linux-based operating system kernel intended to be binary compatible with application software and device drivers made for Microsoft Windows and Linux. As of 1.0-rc2, it consists of a Linux kernel module implementing aspects of the Windows kernel and a modified Wine distribution designed to take advantage of the more native interface. Longene is written in the C programming language and is free and open source software. It is licensed under the terms of the GNU General Public License version 2 (GPLv2).

Although the project is in the alpha stage of development as of 2015, many Windows programs already work well.

Its official website was gone in August, but was restored in 2019. Meanwhile, the source code remains available on GitHub.

== Features ==
Longene aims to add all Windows kernel mechanisms, including system calls, Windows Registry, Windows Driver Model, Deferred Procedure Call, and others, into the Linux kernel to form a new kernel. The new kernel will allow both Linux and Windows applications and device drivers to work without virtualization or emulation. In order to prevent bloating, if a function is available in both the ReactOS and Linux kernel, the Linux implementation is used. Functions are implemented using Linux loadable kernel modules, so they can be loaded and unloaded easily.

Longene has two sets of system calls and their corresponding tables: a Windows syscall set and a Linux syscall set. Windows applications call the syscall table via software interrupt "int 0x2e". Linux applications call the syscall table via "int 0x80".

The Longene project does not develop the Windows and the Linux userland libraries. Those libraries are offered by others projects, such as Wine, ReactOS, GNU, and NDISwrapper.

== Development ==
In September 2005, the Longene project gained sponsorship from Insigma Technology (浙大网新), a China-based IT consulting corporation. The project leader, Decao Mao (毛德操), proposed the idea and route of the Longene. He wrote a series of articles about the market, the intellectual property rights and the techniques to explain why people needed the project and how to implement the Longene. The articles Mao wrote were then compiled to form the white paper of the project.

According to the white paper, to implement the Longene, one needs to add several parts to the Linux kernel:

- A framework that matches the properties and requirements of Windows device drivers (i.e., the Windows device driver framework) so that multiple Windows device driver modules may be loaded into the kernel, while retaining their relationship and running conditions as in Windows.
- A set of export functions defined by Windows kernel export function interface (WDK). To device driver programs, these functions are like library functions provided by kernel.
- Windows native API. Microsoft did not open their native API, but "Windows NT/2000 Native API Reference" and other materials have unveiled this information. Implementing the Windows system API in the Linux kernel could be compared to the implementation of a high level language in assembly, because inside the kernel usable functions are not implemented by the external Linux kernel API anymore but by internal Linux kernel functions.
- The Longene project produces patches for the Linux kernel to accomplish its goal. The project developers expect these patches to eventually merge into the Linux kernel main tree. Those who program on the Windows platform would then be able to develop applications and device drivers for the Linux platform or port their products to Linux platform with a low cost.

=== Development strategy ===
Longene uses Wine as a base for implementing the Windows API. The project re-implements Wine's modules for use as part of the joint kernel. Longene defers from using Wine modules that have not been sufficiently implemented for the project. Versions of Longene are released when several of the Wine modules have been successfully implemented into the kernel. The new stable version will then be used as a base for implementing future modules. Windows API that have not been implemented by Wine are developed into modules from scratch. Since the Longene kernel does the work of the Windows NT kernel, Wine's own userspace kernel emulation (wineserver) is not needed.

For device drivers, Longene imports NDISwrapper into the kernel. Modifications are made to NDISwrapper for missing functionality of the Windows Driver Model using ReactOS code as a reference. The Windows Driver Kit implementation is based on ReactOS code. It uses a combination of redirecting drivers to Linux kernel resources and additional libraries that implement functions that cannot be implemented in Linux.

=== Version history ===
An earlier version, unifiedkernel-2.6.13, released on February 15, 2006. This version actualized the Windows system call mechanism.

color	meaning
red	Release no longer supported
yellow	Release, supported
green	Current release
blue	Future release

Version	Release date	Release Information
0.1.0	April 30, 2006	kernel-win32 ported; Windows system call mechanism based on "int 2e"
0.2.0	December 1, 2006	Windows process/thread creating implemented; partial implementation of Windows APC mechanism
0.2.1	February 4, 2008	Windows process/thread management; virtual memory management; synchronization; object management; built-in EXE loading function
0.2.2	October 31, 2008	Token mechanism; GUI installation program
0.2.2-1	December 17, 2008	bug fixes
0.2.3	February 12, 2009	Windows registry mechanism ported from Wine
0.2.4	May 22, 2009	file system management ported from Wine; partial implementation of registry management APIs; binary packages for popular distributions provided
0.2.4.1	August 31, 2009	based on Linux Kernel 2.6.30; support of new file systems (ext4 and others)
0.3	May 31, 2010	move all functions of wineserver into kernel space and get rid of wineserver
0.3.1	February 26, 2011	support non-root user; support apps Chinese path
0.3.2	June 8, 2011	support wineconsole, Windows console apps，such as cmd.exe can run like this way: wineconsole cmd.exe; improve the way of creation of process，so windows native-app and wine buitin-app can created by each other.
1.0-rc1	December 31, 2013	complete modification of the framework, the Longene is no longer needed kernel patch; Longene has supported SMP; more convenient installation, better compatibility, better stability
1.0-rc2	January 16, 2014	upgrade wine to version 1.7.10; solve ordinary users after the restart problem; solve several file permissions; modify file loading type
2.0	2015	QEMU code integration; support Windows applications running on an ARM machine

=== Current and future development ===
Developers are currently working on Longene 2.0, which will support Windows applications running on non-x86 architecture hardware, such as ARM and Loongson. Additionally, the developers are working on AMD64 support and porting NDISWrapper code to the project.

Not yet implemented (but planned):

- QEMU code integration
- The WDM device driver framework
- The Windows DPC mechanism
- Exported kernel functions defined by Windows DDK

=== Available Open Source resources ===
Linux kernel
Longene is based on the Linux kernel. It implements its functions in the Linux loadable kernel modules (LKMs). As opposed to ReactOS implementing functions from scratch, Longene exploits the abundant code and documentation of the Linux kernel to create its functions. These are the main approaches to implement Windows mechanisms in Longene:
1. System call interface – Some of them can be taken from the appropriate Linux system calls, or partially reuse the code from corresponding Linux system calls. The rest that have no counterpart in Linux need to use low-level Linux kernel functions in their implementation.
2. Device driver framework – The device driver interrupt service register is using the Linux interrupt mechanism, the device drivers perceive running Windows kernel, which is mapped to the Linux kernel running underneath. Device driver DPC requests are translated to Linux-bh functions.
3. The Microsoft Windows native system files that are copyrighted by Microsoft — The category of .sys modules used for common external devices, such as disk, USB, graphics devices, network equipment and so on, for which there are corresponding functions in the Linux kernel. To drive those devices, it is only required to build a bridge and there is no need to create .sys modules. For the rest of .sys modules that have no the corresponding objects in the Linux kernel, an emulation is required.
4. Windows DDK – The majority of device driver interface functions and data structures have counterparts in the Linux kernel. Some functions have no exact equivalent in the Linux kernel, and there is a need to build a wrapper using Linux kernel stuff. In practice, some resource calls and references can be redirected or adapted to Linux kernel counterparts, and the rest need to be implemented from scratch.
ReactOS
ReactOS is a clone of MS Windows written from scratch. Longene uses ReactOS code as a reference to implement some basic mechanisms of the Microsoft Windows Operating System. That involves implementing the Windows device driver framework, NDIS, the system call interface, the process management and resource management, the device driver interface, etc.
Wine
Wine implements a compatibility layer, providing alternative implementations of the DLLs that Windows programs call, and processes to substitute for the Windows NT kernel. As opposed to Longene using the microkernel functions to implement Windows API in kernel space, Wine uses the macro host OS API to implement Windows API in userspace. Longene offers the Windows Process management, Thread management, Object management, etc. in kernel; Wine offers those by wineserver running in userspace. Longene depends on Wine for the user libraries (the .dll files). Most of Wine's DLLs can be used directly by Longene. Wine code (such as the Windows Registry table) can be referred to implement some functions. In the transitional state, Longene uses Wine to offer those functions that have not been completed yet.
Kernel-Win32
Kernel-Win32 is a project intended to move some functions from the Wineserver into the Linux kernel to accelerate Wine. Longene project ported (and partly re-implemented) Kernel-Win32 into Longene to implement the Windows system call mechanism.
NDISwrapper
NDISWrapper recreated a part of Windows NT kernel in a Linux kernel module, making possible to execute modern Windows drivers inside a Linux kernel box. NDISWrapper consists of a NTOSKRNL API, a basic WDM controller, and a set of Windows call wrappers such as Wireless/NDIS/USB/PnP to Linux APIs. NDISWrapper is not limited to executing only NDIS drivers; other WDM drivers can be used as long as the driver doesn't call unimplemented Windows API functions. The first step of WDM implementation in Longene will be to import NDISWrapper into Longene. Then the Longene project team will implement its WDM via modifying NDISwrapper and adding functions into NDISWrapper with ReactOS code as a reference.
QEMU
To run Windows x86 binary applications directly on the ARM architecture, there is a need of an emulation, of course. QEMU is an open source emulator in Linux that can run Wine, but the result is unacceptably slow. QEMU interprets all x86 instructions in user space (including the Wine code); only in case of Linux system calls the application is running at full speed. The result is slow, because applications spend most of the time in the emulated user space, and less time in the kernel. But if the Win API DLLs, provided by Wine could be used outside of QEMU, they would run at full speed because they can be compiled natively, and the overall running speed should significantly improve. This way of combining Wine and QEMU, and putting Wineserver functions into the kernel, is the idea of Longene 2.0.

== Users ==
Magic Linux – Magic Linux is a Chinese Linux distribution based on Red Hat Linux. Version 2.1 of Magic Linux, released on December 15, 2008, includes a main version (DVD, with Linux kernel 2.6.25.20), a compact version (CD, with Linux kernel 2.6.25.20) and a Longene version (CD, with Longene 0.2.2).

=== Hardware requirements ===
The minimum hardware requirements to run are:

- IA-32 processor
- 128 MB RAM
- IDE or SATA harddisk
- VGA compatible video card
- Standard (PS/2 or USB) keyboard
- PS/2 compatible mouse or Microsoft Mouse compatible serial mouse

=== Architecture support ===
- IA-32 (working)
- x86-64 (not working, in progress)
- Loongson 3 (not working, in progress)
- ARM (not working, in progress)
- Longene can also be run on software which emulates or virtualizes the above hardware, such as VMware and VirtualBox.

== See also ==
- ReactOS
- Cooperative Linux
- Cygwin
- NDISwrapper
- Windows Services for UNIX
- Windows Subsystem for Linux
- Wine (software)
