= Ecco Pro =

ECCO Pro
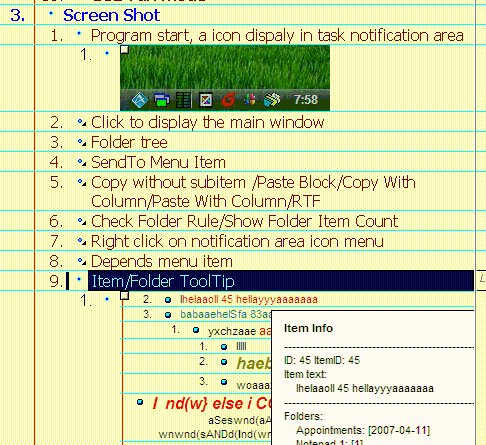
- View of very basic outline with graphics. Notepad view in ECCO Pro.
- Developers: NetManage, Arabesque Software, Ecco UserGroup Members
- Stable release: 4.544 / 11 June 2010; 16 years ago
- Operating system: Windows
- Type: Outliner / Personal Information Management

Ecco Pro is a personal information manager software based on an outliner, and supporting folders similar to spreadsheet columns that allow filtering and sorting of information based upon user defined criteria.

The software was originally produced by Arabesque Software in 1993, then purchased by NetManage, and discontinued in 1997.

== Overview ==
The product offers three primary types of views – phone book views, calendar views, and notepad views. Central to the program's design is an outlining structure and the ability to easily manipulate information regardless of in which view it was entered. Multiple notepad, calendar, and phonebook views can be opened, and each item seen in each view can be a collapsible outline, with each line assignable to folders/categories which can themselves be their own views, text field, pulldown menu, calendar date (including repeating date), or phonebook entry.

== Product functionality ==
ECCO Professional was introduced by Arabesque Software in 1993, as a Personal Information Manager (PIM) with a database backend. This version supports calendar and contact data, as well as to-do lists, and allows integration with other software via import and export capability, Dynamic Data Exchange (DDE), Object Linking and Embedding (OLE). A feature called "Shooter" puts a cut and paste tool at the top of the screen facilitating copy of data to and from ECCO. The user interface is based on a "universal outliner" and folders, which allow the user to build a variety of views organizing related information of mixed types. Data is stored as discrete objects, and can be dragged as dynamic links to multiple folders creating cross references. Ecco version 1.x supports shared folders and outlines for network access to data, but does not support windows workgroups. Ram based, the program was considered fast and relatively easy on laptop batteries, but a heavy consumer of system resources.

ECCO version 2.0, released in 1994, added support for workgroups, including group scheduling via email systems compliant with MAPI or VIM protocols, and Microsoft Schedule Plus, and sharing of contacts, calendars, and outlines, as well as file synchronization and reconciliation via intranet connections or email. In 1995 PC Magazine praised ECCO as a workgroup tool for scheduling and task management and noted its ability to handle free form data, but considered version 2.0 a "poor choice as a contact manager" which requires customization to match features of contemporary products, and lacks structured and complex search queries, good reporting, logging and correspondence functions.

ECCO version 3.0 was released in the summer of 1995 with an updated user interface based on a ring binder. Other additions include an Internet launch tool equipped with an address book containing links to over 2,000 sites. Internet support for the Shooter tool allows the user to push a URL and title for a web page back to ECCO. Searching improved with a query tool based on forms and support for boolean filters.

ECCO Pro version 4.0 added 32 bit support and OLE 2.0. as well as integration with NetManage's Chameleon and Z-Mail. Version 4.01 has support for Palm Pilot.

== History ==
Ecco Pro was originally developed by Pete Polash, who had sold an early Macintosh based presentation program to Aldus and Bob Perez, a Harvard-trained lawyer hired by Apple as a programmer and Evangelist in the 1980s. It was first released in 1993 by Arabesque Software, Inc., based in Bellevue, Washington. PC Magazine awarded ECCO Pro their Editor's Choice award in 1996 and 1997

Development by NetManage ceased in 1997 after the July 1997 release of version 4.01. Andrew Brown wrote in The Guardian: "So what happened to the paragon of a program? The market killed it. First it was sold to a much larger company, Netmanage; presumably doing this made the original programmers a lot of money. Then Netmanage panicked when Microsoft Outlook came along as a "free" part of the Office suite, and killed development on the program." NetManage chief executive officer Zvi Alon noted that 'As soon as Microsoft decided to give away Outlook with Office, we started getting phone calls questioning the value of Ecco Pro'.

Even though the source code for Ecco Pro is not open source, development of plugin extensions to the software continues. According to Scott Rosenberg, a programmer using the handle "slangmgh" developed an extension to Ecco Pro posted to ecco_pro users group on Yahoo which includes fixes and upgrades to the program, and may incorporate the Lua scripting language. The EccoPro to Android Synchronization Software MyPhoneExplorer able to synchronize Contacts, Calendar, Tasks and Ecco Outlines to Android Phones and Tablets was released on 9 July 2013.
