= Microsoft outage =

Microsoft outage may refer to:

- 2024 CrowdStrike-related IT outages, which impacted computers running Microsoft Windows
- 2026 Microsoft outage, which impacted Microsoft services including Microsoft 365 and Outlook

== See also ==
- Downtime § Worldwide outages
- Timeline of Microsoft
