= WHCK =

WHCK may refer to:

- Windows Hardware Certification Kit, a test automation framework provided by Microsoft
- WHCK-LP, a defunct radio station in Hopewell, Virginia, United States
