= Microtex 666 =

Australian videotex system

- Developer: Telecom Australia, Sean Howard
- Type: Videotex
- Launched: 1986
- Discontinued: 1989
- Platform: Prestel based
- Status: Discontinued

Microtex 666 was an Australian Prestel-based videotex system that operated from 1986 to 1989.

The service was accessed through a text based dialup service from Telecom Australia known as Viatel.

Microtex 666 was dedicated to microcomputer enthusiasts and included a large telesoftware download library, a semi-realtime online chat, and a 1,000-user massively multiuser game known as the Great Galactic Conflict.

It was owned and founded by Sean Howard, and promoted through Australian Personal Computer magazine.

For much of its existence, Microtex 666 was externally managed by Scott Sanderson at Information Solutions, which also sold a package consisting of modem plus software, since few people owned modems at that time.

Microtex 666 was eventually purchased by Telecom. Howard went on to found OzEmail, Australia's largest ISP.
