= HCK (disambiguation) =

HCK may refer to:

- HCK, an enzyme that in humans is encoded by the HCK gene
- HC Keski-Uusimaa, a Finnish ice hockey team based in Kerava
- Windows HCK (Hardware Certification Kit), an earlier released framework of Windows HLK (Hardware Lab Kit)
