= WHQL Testing =

Certification for device drivers on Windows

The Windows Hardware Certification Program (formerly Windows Hardware Quality Labs Testing, WHQL Testing, or Windows Logo Testing) is Microsoft's testing process which involves running a series of tests on third-party device drivers, and then submitting the log files from these tests to Microsoft for review. The procedure may also include Microsoft running their own tests on a wide range of equipment, such as different hardware and different Microsoft Windows editions.

== Overview ==
Certified for Vista Logo

Warning for uncertified hardware drivers on Windows XP

The "Found New Hardware Wizard" of Windows XP

The WHQL project was started since Windows 95. Windows 2000 added support for WHQL signature checking.

Products that pass the WHQL tests get to use a "Certified for Windows" logo aka "Designed for Windows" logo, which certifies that the hardware or software has had some share of testing by Microsoft to ensure compatibility. The actual logo used depends on the version of Microsoft Windows. (In the past, Microsoft also awarded a similar logo as part of a different Software Certification program to apps that passed software compatibility tests.)

For device drivers passing the WHQL tests, Microsoft creates a digitally signed certification file that, when included in the driver installation package, prevents Windows from displaying a warning message that the driver has not been certified by Microsoft.

Since June 2007, Microsoft has added an Audio Fidelity Test (Audio Precision SYS-2722-A-M) requirement for System Submissions.

A company can choose to sign their own drivers rather than go through the WHQL testing process. These drivers would not qualify for the "Certified for Windows" logos, but they would install on Windows without a warning. However, in some cases, such as drivers created after the termination of WHQL testing for a version of the operating system, the Windows operating system may refuse to start the driver and will require enabling the operating system's test mode by a command prompt to otherwise run it.

Device drivers that have passed the WHQL tests are also made available for download using Windows Update or the Microsoft Update Catalog. Not all of the drivers in Windows Update are up to date. On Windows XP, when Windows detects a new device for which it does not have built-in drivers, it shows a Found New Hardware Wizard dialog box. Microsoft has since dismantled this dialog box, but one way to avoid it on Windows XP was to pre-install a WHQL-certified driver before connecting the device.

Since 7 January 2014, Microsoft no longer requires a WHQL testing fee, which used to be US$250 per operating system family. This fee covered both x86 and x64 driver SKUs, if submitted simultaneously, and was non-refundable. The fee did not include other expenses, such as the Windows license necessary for running WHQL tests, and the VeriSign certificate necessary for submitting test results.

== See also ==
- Windows Hardware Lab Kit (WHLK)
