= Relay Gold =

Terminal emulator software program

Relay Gold is a terminal emulator software program that supports modem transmission and mainframe file transfer. It was developed by Microcom, and marketed by Relay Technology until its acquisition in the late 1990s by NetManage.

Relay Gold supports asynchronous serial communication, TYMNET and TELENET networks, satellite connections, and IBM 3270 emulation boards. It uses a data compression algorithm licensed from Adaptive Computer Technologies to provide file transfer speeds up to four times the effective speed of the modem with which it is used. The software allows for up to 15 simultaneous communications sessions on a PC, which can run in the background. Scripting language allows for automation of log in, data collection, and file transfer. The software can write these scripts automatically through keylogging.
