= NDISwrapper =

Driver wrapper for Windows devices used on Linux

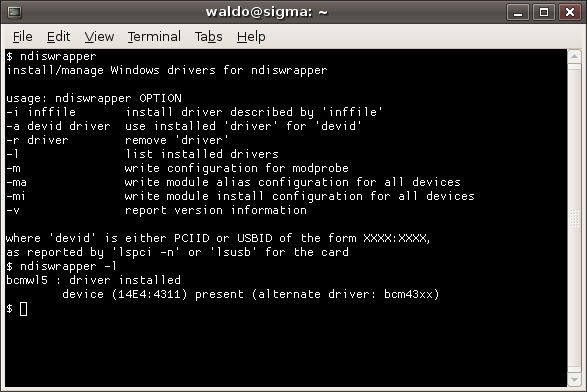
- ndiswrapper command line running in a terminal window
- Developers: Jan Kiszka, Giridhar Pemmasani, Pontus Fuchs
- Stable release: 1.63 / May 3, 2020; 5 years ago
- Operating system: Linux on IA-32 and x86-64 architectures only
- Type: Driver wrapper
- License: GNU GPL
- Website: The NDISwrapper wiki, NDISwrapper Download Area

NDISwrapper is a free software driver wrapper that enables the use of Windows XP network device drivers (for devices such as PCI cards, USB modems, and routers) on Linux operating systems. NDISwrapper works by implementing the Windows kernel and NDIS APIs and dynamically linking Windows network drivers to this implementation. As a result, it only works on systems based on the instruction set architectures supported by Windows, namely IA-32 and x86-64.

Native drivers for some network adapters are not available on Linux as some manufacturers maintain proprietary interfaces and do not write cross-platform drivers. NDISwrapper allows the use of Windows drivers, which are available for virtually all modern PC network adapters.

== Use ==
There are three steps: Creating a Linux driver, installing it, and using it. NDISwrapper is composed of two main parts, a command-line tool used at installation time and a Windows subsystem used when an application calls the Wi-Fi subsystem.

As the outcome of an NDISwrapper installation should be some sort of Linux driver to be able to work with Linux applications, the first action the user does is to "compile" a couple or more of Windows files, and the NDISwrapper's version of Windows DDK into a Linux Kernel Module. This is done with a tool named "ndiswrapper". The resultant Linux driver is then installed (often manually) in the OS. A Linux application can then send request to this Linux driver that automatically does the needed adaptations to call its—now—internal Windows driver and DDK.

To achieve this "compilation" NDISwrapper requires at least the ".inf" and the ".sys" files invariably supplied as parts of the Windows driver. For example, if the driver is called "mydriver", with the files mydriver.inf and mydriver.sys and vendorid:productid 0000:0000, then NDISwrapper installs the driver to /etc/ndiswrapper/mydriver/. This directory contains three files:

- 0000:0000.conf, which contains information extracted from the inf file
- mydriver.inf (the original inf file)
- mydriver.sys (the driver file)

== Graphical frontends ==
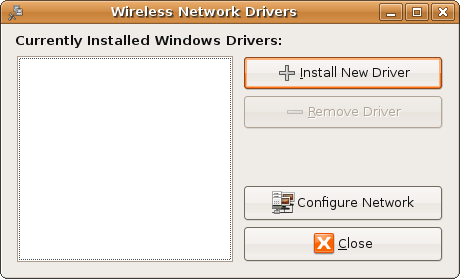
Ndisgtk graphical interface

There are graphical frontends to NDISwrapper, such as Ndisgtk and NdisConfig, which allow NDISwrapper to be installed using a graphical user interface rather than console commands.

== Architecture ==
NDISwrapper enables a Unix-like system to use Windows drivers of type NDIS and WIFI. It was useful at a time when there were no Linux Wi-Fi drivers for common Wi-Fi cards. It is composed of:

- An NDIS driver, which is a kind of overlay for Ethernet device drivers.
- A Wi-Fi manager, to control the radio and security part of the Wi-Fi card. It exposes a "wireless extension" interface.
- A USB manager and a PnP manager to make it possible to use Wi-Fi cards embedded in USB sticks. The USB manager is composed of two parts, first a tiny USBD implementation (USB stack) then a simple Windows Driver Model (WDM) USB driver that is itself composed of two parts: The front part will receive calls from the NDISwrapper USB stack (in fact from calls coming from the original Windows driver that were normally intended to go to the Windows USB stack) and the rear part is using the Linux USB stack.
- A minimal Ntoskrnl simulating the DDK for:
  - managing calls from the Windows driver.
  - managing IRP to the Windows driver (WDM only at the moment)
  - managing filter drivers in a simplistic way
  - loading/unloading Windows drivers
- A wrapper converting Linux calls to Windows and the other way round, also managing results and error codes

== How it works ==
Ndiswrapper uses Windows INF files.

When a Linux application calls a device which is registered on Linux as an NDISwrapper device, the NDISwrapper determines which Windows driver is targeted. It then converts the Linux query into Windows parlance, it calls the Windows driver, waits for the result and translates it into Linux parlance then sends the result back to the Linux application. It's possible from a Linux driver (NDISwrapper is a Linux driver) to call a Windows driver because they both execute in the same address space (the same as the Linux kernel). If the Windows driver is composed of layered drivers (for example one for Ethernet above one for USB) it's the upper layer driver which is called, and this upper layer will create new calls (IRP in Windows parlance) by calling the "mini ntoskrnl". So the "mini ntoskrnl" must know there are other drivers, it must have registered them in its internal database a priori by reading the Windows ".inf" files.

== Similar programs ==
- DriverLoader is a commercial tool produced by Linuxant for Linux which seems to provide the same functionality as NDISwrapper.
- Independently from, but roughly simultaneously with the NDISwrapper project, Bill Paul of Wind River Systems developed a similar system, known as Project Evil or The NDISulator, for FreeBSD. It has since been ported to DragonFly BSD and NetBSD.

== Limitations ==
- NDISwrapper relies on the elderly "wireless-extensions" to enable applications to access Wi-Fi.
- As NDISwrapper relies on Windows drivers; it only supports i386 and x86_64 architectures.
- NDISwrapper does not implement NDIS 6 (Windows Vista version) yet, limiting drivers to Windows XP. As of October 2013, a code branch at the project site has been under development since 2006, but a feature request from 2009 has been left unassigned.

While it is not a major problem for the x86 architecture because of the popularity of Windows XP IA-32, many vendors choose to make 64-bit driver versions only for Windows Vista – which means that Linux systems using the x86-64 architecture are unable to use such networking devices (they can neither use XP IA-32 NDIS5 because they are 64-bit systems nor NDIS6 64-bit drivers because they can't use NDIS6). It's still possible to use Windows XP 64 bit drivers which implement NDIS5, however, there are fewer available drivers for xp64 (NDIS5/64 bit) than for XP32 (NDIS5/32 bit).

- Since 2006, most Windows drivers are compliant with Windows Driver Foundation (WDF) which NDISWrapper can't use. It renders NDISWrapper obsolete, as it only supports the previous WDM driver framework.

== See also ==
- List of router firmware projects
- cabextract
- DebWRT
- INF file
- LibreCMC
- Linux Unified Kernel
- ReactOS
