= I2O =

Intelligent Input/Output (I2O) is a defunct computer input/output (I/O) specification. I2O was originally designed to make use of the Intel i960 microprocessor as the I/O offload engine, bringing channel I/O to the PC. I2O emerged from Intel in the mid 1990s with the publication of the I2O specification in 1996 by the Intelligent I/O Special Interest Group, which dissolved as of 13 October 2000.

I2O's principal architectural components included the I/O processor (IOP) and a split device driver model, with an OSM (OS Module) running in the host operating system and a HDM (Hardware Device Module) running on the I/O processor. This formally separated OS-specific driver functionality from the underlying device, and the two software components used message passing for communications. This split is suggestive of another initiative in which Intel participated at the time, the Uniform Driver Interface (UDI), which sought to establish a common device driver interface spanning multiple software platforms.

I2O was plagued by several problems: the i960 was largely a failure and I2O made systems more expensive in a low cost marketplace. Additionally, the I2O SIG was seen as hostile to open source and insensitive to small players because it charged high fees for participation and was dominated by a few corporate players, notably Microsoft. While it remains unclear which of these factors caused the ultimate failure of I2O, only a few server class machines were ever built with onboard I2O. The I2O-SIG disbanded in October 2000, with a small amount of architectural information being made available via FTP at about the same time.

A number of x86-compatible operating systems provided support (or still do) for I2O, including Windows, Linux (removed in 4.0), Solaris, OpenBSD, and NetWare.

== Examples of systems which utilized I2O ==
- Compaq Proliant
- HP NetServer LH3000
- PERC 4 DC SCSI/i20 on Dell PowerEdge
- NEC Express5800
