= Uniform Driver Interface =

The Uniform Driver Interface (UDI) is a defunct project developed by several companies to define a portable interface for device drivers.

The Uniform Driver Interface (UDI) allowed device drivers to be portable across both hardware platforms and operating systems without any changes to the driver source. With the participation of multiple OS, platform and device hardware vendors, UDI was intended to be the first interface which was likely to achieve such portability on a wide scale. UDI provided an encapsulating environment for drivers with well-defined interfaces which isolated drivers from OS policies and from platform and I/O bus dependencies. In principle, this allowed driver development to be totally independent of OS development. In addition, the UDI architecture was intended to insulate drivers from platform specifics such as byte-ordering, DMA implications, multi-processing, interrupt implementations and I/O bus topologies.

While UDI could potentially benefit open source operating systems such as Linux and *BSD by providing more driver support from companies, some open source/free software advocates feared that UDI would cause a proliferation of closed source drivers and a reduction in open source support by companies, undermining the purpose of the free software and open source movements. Richard Stallman (the leader of the free software movement) has claimed that the project does not benefit the free software movement.

== See also ==
- I2O
- Network Driver Interface Specification (NDIS)
- Open Data-Link Interface (ODI)
- Universal Network Device Interface (UNDI)
- PC/TCP Packet Driver
