= Captive NTFS =

Captive NTFS is a discontinued open-source project in the Linux programming community, started by Jan Kratochvíl. It is a driver wrapper around the original Microsoft Windows NTFS file system driver using parts of ReactOS code. By taking this approach, it aimed to provide safe write support to NTFS partitions.

Until the release of NTFS-3G, it was the only Linux NTFS driver with full write support.

On January 26, 2006 Kratochvíl released version 1.1.7 of the package. It restores compatibility with recent Linux kernels by replacing the obsolete LUFS (Linux Userland File System) module with FUSE (File System in Userspace), which as of Linux 2.6.14 has been part of the official Linux kernel.

Captive NTFS requires NTFS.SYS, which cannot be freely distributed for legal reasons. It can either be obtained from an installed Windows system (which most computers with NTFS partitions are likely to have) or extracted from certain Microsoft service packs.
