= Trumpet Winsock =

TCP/IP stack

- .ico used by the application shortcut to TCPMAN.EXE, which is part of Trumpet Winsock
- Original authors: Peter Tattam, Trumpet Software International
- Release: 1994
- Operating system: Microsoft Windows
- Successor: None (by Trumpet Software); The Microsoft implementation of Winsock with Windows 95
- License: Shareware
- Website: trumpet.com.au at the Wayback Machine (archived 1999-01-28)

Trumpet Winsock is a TCP/IP stack for Windows 3.x that implemented the Winsock API, which is an API for network sockets. It was developed by Peter Tattam from Trumpet Software International and distributed as shareware software.

Peter Tattam's current company, Tattam Software Enterprises Pty. Ltd., bought the rights to the Trumpet suite of software products in 2008, including Trumpet Winsock. Trumpet Winsock is still distributed as shareware on the company website.

== History ==
The first version, 1.0A, was released in 1994. It rapidly gained reputation as the best tool for connecting to the internet. Guides for internet connectivity commonly advised to use Trumpet Winsock. The author received very little financial compensation for developing the software. In 1996, a 32-bit version was released.

In the Trumpet Software Pty Ltd. v OzEmail Pty Ltd. case, the defendant had distributed Trumpet Winsock for free with a magazine. The defendant had also suppressed notices that the software was developed by Trumpet Software.

== Architecture ==
The binary for Trumpet Winsock is called TCPMAN.EXE. Other files included the main winsock.dll and three UCSC connection .cmd file scripts.
