= PC/TCP Packet Driver =

Networking API for MS-DOS

PC/TCP Packet Driver is a networking API for MS-DOS, PC DOS, and later x86 DOS implementations such as DR-DOS, FreeDOS, etc. It implements the lowest levels of a TCP/IP stack, where the remainder is typically implemented either by terminate-and-stay-resident drivers or as a library linked into an application program. It was invented in 1983 at MIT's Lab for Computer Science (CSR/CSC group under Jerry Saltzer and David D. Clark), and was commercialized in 1986 by FTP Software.

A packet driver uses an x86 interrupt number (INT) between 60h .. 80h. The number used is detected at runtime, it is most commonly 60h but may be changed to avoid application programs which use fixed interrupts for internal communications. The interrupt vector is used as a pointer (4-bytes little endian) to the address of a possible interrupt handler. If the null-terminated ASCII text string "PKT DRVR" is found within the first 12-bytes -- more specifically in bytes 3 through 11 -- immediately following the entry point then a driver has been located.

Packet drivers can implement many different network interfaces, including Ethernet, Token Ring, RS-232, Arcnet, and X.25.

== Functions ==
Function	AH(Dec)	Category
driver_info	1	Basic
access_type	2	Basic
release_type	3	Basic
send_pkt	4	Basic
terminate	5	Basic
get_address	6	Basic
reset_interface	7	Basic
get_parameters	10	High-performance packet driver
as_send_pkt	11	High-performance packet driver
set_rcv_mode	20	Extended packet driver
get_rcv_mode	21	Extended packet driver
set_multicast_list	22	Extended packet driver
get_multicast_list	23	Extended packet driver
get_statistics	24	Extended packet driver
set_address	25	Extended packet driver

== Drivers ==
WinPKT is a driver that enables use of packet drivers under Microsoft Windows that moves around applications in memory.

W3C507 is a DLL to packet driver for the Microsoft Windows environment.

Support for Ethernet alike network interface over Serial line IP (using 8250 UART), CSLIP, Parallel line IP, IPX, Token Ring, LocalTalk, ARCNET.

== See also ==
- Crynwr Collection - alternative free packet driver collection
- Network Driver Interface Specification (NDIS) - developed by Microsoft and 3Com, free wrappers
- Open Data-Link Interface (ODI) - developed by Apple and Novell
- Universal Network Device Interface (UNDI) - used by Intel PXE
- Uniform Driver Interface (UDI) - defunct
- Preboot Execution Environment - network boot by Intel, widespread
