= Great Galactic Conflict =

The Great Galactic Conflict, (GGC), was a turn based Massively multiplayer online game (MMOG) which was available in Australia around 1986.

The game was accessed through a text based dialup service from Telecom Australia known as Viatel.

Briefly, the game mechanic required players to enter their moves during a one-week period. Once a week the game engine would process all entered moves and compute a result which became the basis for the following week's moves. An entire game took 10 weeks and GGC games were played 3 times.

GGC moves were heavily influenced by negotiations between players which formed a significant portion of the game play.

In 1988 the winner of the game was eligible to receive a prize of $2500.

The game was written by Ian Davies for Microtex 666 from 1983 to 1984.

GGC was engineered to support 1,000 players, but peaked at around 600. Back end software running on DOS-based PCs would take several hours to determine the collective outcome of the players' moves. Viatel's "bulk update protocol" was used to upload and distribute the new game state to the players.

Australian Personal Computer wrote in a preview: "From what we have seen of The Great Galactic Conflict test games, it certainly promises to be an exciting event of nationwide proportions."
