= Sean Howard =

Australian entrepreneur

Sean Howard AO
- Born: Sean Martin Howard; 1959 or 1960 (age 66–67); Sydney, Australia
- Occupation: Entrepreneur

Sean Martin Howard AO is an Australian entrepreneur, founder of OzEmail, at one time Australia's largest Internet company.

In the 1980s Howard founded Australian Personal Computer, Australia's top-selling computer magazine. He also developed the Microtex 666 service that ran on the Viatel system. In 1988 he became an original investor in ISYS Search Software, one of the pioneer search engine products. In 1992 he sold his Computer Publications business, including Microtex, to Australian Consolidated Press. Howard founded the pioneering public email service Oz-E-Mail. In 1994 businessmen Malcolm Turnbull and Trevor Kennedy invested and the business was relaunched as internet service provider OzEmail. In 1996 OzEmail was listed on the Nasdaq stock exchange. In 1997 OzEmail Phone was launched and in 1998 the company was listed on the Australian Stock Exchange.

In December 1998 American telco WorldCom took a 14.9% stake in OzEmail and in March 1999 WorldCom completed the acquisition for a total of $520 million. In July 2002 WorldCom declared bankruptcy and sold the Australian ISP business to iiNet in 2005 for $110 million.

In 2000 Howard joined the board of the telco Optus as a non-executive director. He was a director of the WebCentral Group, a web and application hosting company when it was taken over by Melbourne IT in 2006.

At the 2015 Australia Day Honours, Howard was appointed an Officer of the Order of Australia for distinguished service to a range of charitable organisations, particularly youth welfare and medical research, as a major benefactor and supporter, and to business.
