= Interop =

Information technology conference

Interop is an annual information technology conference organised by Informa PLC. Founded in 1986, the event takes place in the US and Tokyo (Japan) each year. Interop promotes interoperability and openness, beginning with IP networks and continuing in today's emerging cloud computing era.

== Founding ==
In August 1986 the Internet Architecture Board (IAB) held the first TCP/IP Vendors Workshop in Monterey, California. This event later became Interop. The conference was founded by Dan Lynch, an early Internet activist. From the beginning, large corporations, such as IBM and DEC, attended the meeting. The Las Vegas International Telecoms Show was created in 1986, a decade before the technology and internet bubble that made it a success.

== Internet Toaster ==
At the 1989 Interop show, Dan Lynch, Interop president, promised John Romkey star billing if he designed an internet interface for a toaster.

At the 1990 Interop show, John Romkey and his friend Simon Hackett debuted a Sunbeam Deluxe Automatic Radiant Control Toaster connected to the Internet with TCP/IP networking, and controlled with a Simple Network Management Protocol (SNMP) Management Information Base (MIB). The internet interface had one remote control, to turn the power on and off, and the power duration controlled the darkness of the toast. Local control by a human being was still needed to insert the bread.

At the 1990 Interop show, a small robotic crane, remotely controlled through the internet, picked up a slice of bread and dropped it into the toaster slot.

== Dot-com bubble ==
In 2001, Interop attendance reached a peak with 61,000 visitors, just before the bursting of this Dot-com bubble, which resulted in a major stock market crash for this sector. The 2001 event was marked by innovation, and among the major telecom providers, the rivalry between Juniper Networks and Cisco Systems in the Terabit router market, while the so-called "alternative" operators, such as KPNQwest, Global Crossing and Carrier, launched revolutionary offerings in the enterprise market.

After the crash of 2002, the fever subsided. The 2004 edition in Las Vegas brought together less than 300 exhibitors. The following editions saw a recovery. The organizer of the 2013 edition hoped to increase the number of visitors from 18,000 in 2012 to 20,000 with the presence of 500 suppliers.

The 2026 Interop Tokyo attracted over 150,000 attendees.
