= RUMBA =

Terminal emulation software program

Rumba
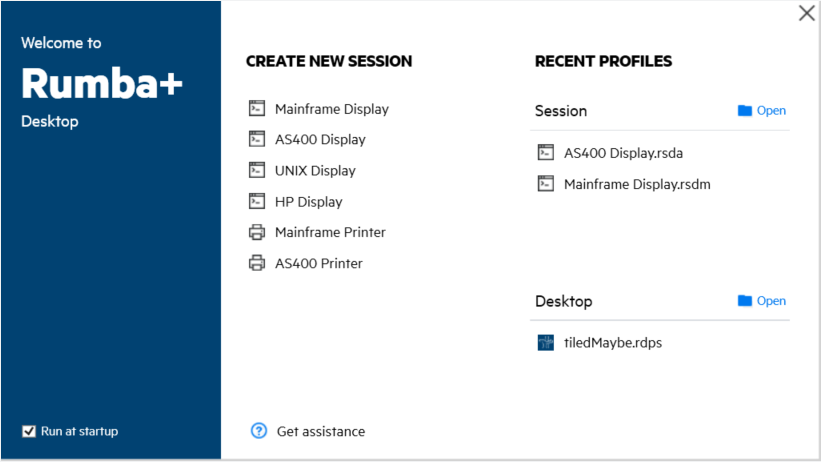
- Screenshot of Rumba+ Desktop 10.1 Welcome Dialog
- Developer: Micro Focus
- Stable release: 10.1 / October 1, 2020
- Operating system: Windows 7, Windows 8, Windows 10
- Platform: IA-32, x86-64
- Type: Terminal emulator
- Website: www.microfocus.com/products/rumba/

Rumba is a terminal emulation software program with user interface (UI) modernization properties. Rumba and Rumba+ allow users to connect to legacy systems (typically a mainframe) via desktop, web, and mobile. Rumba provides IT end users with a modern UI, allowing them to bypass green screen applications.

Launched in 1989, Rumba (previously RUMBA) was one of the first Windows based terminal emulators available.

Originally developed by Wall Data, Inc, Rumba was acquired by NetManage and then by Micro Focus.
