= John Romkey =

American computer scientist

- Born: United States
- Known for: PC/IP, Netwatch

John Romkey is an American computer scientist who along with Donald W. Gillies co-developed MIT PC/IP, the first TCP/IP stack in the industry for MS-DOS on the IBM PC in 1983 while at the Massachusetts Institute of Technology. In 1986, Romkey founded FTP Software, a commercial TCP/IP stack provider. Romkey authored the first network analyzer, Netwatch, predating the Network General Sniffer. He served on the IAB. With Simon Hackett, Romkey connected the first appliance (a toaster) to the Internet in 1990. Romkey was one of the owners of Blue Forest Research, a consulting company.

FTP Software provided commercial third-party TCP/IP packages for MS-DOS and Microsoft Windows. With the advent of Microsoft's own free TCP/IP stack, codenamed "Wolverine" and first introduced as an optional extra for Windows for Workgroups 3.11, FTP Software was driven out of business, along with all the other commercial providers of TCP/IP stacks.

== Publications ==
- McCahill, M.; Romkey, J.; Schwartz, M.; Sollins, K.; Verschuren, T.; Weider, C. (November 1995). Report of the IAB Workshop on Internet Information Infrastructure, October 12–14, 1994. IETF. doi:10.17487/RFC1862. RFC 1862.
- Romkey, J. (June 1988). A nonstandard for transmission of IP datagrams over serial lines: SLIP. IETF. doi:10.17487/RFC1055. RFC 1055.
