= NetManage =

Software company

NetManage Inc.
- Industry: Software
- Founded: 1990
- Founder: Zvi Alon
- Defunct: 2008
- Fate: Acquired
- Successor: Micro Focus International
- Headquarters: Haifa, Israel, Cupertino, California;
- Products: RUMBA, OnWeb, ViewNow, Librados, SOA Planner
- Website: www.netmanage.com

NetManage Inc. was a software company based in Cupertino, California, founded in 1990 by Zvi Alon, an Israeli engineer. The company's development centre was located at the MATAM technology park, in Haifa, Israel. In June 2008 the company was acquired by Micro Focus International, a British company based in Newbury, Berkshire.

== History ==
NetManage was founded in 1990 by Zvi Alon, an Israeli engineer who was trained at the Technion-Israel Institute of Technology and immigrated to the Silicon Valley in the 1980s. It was one of the first software companies to offer TCP/IP, networking, and email products.

During the dotcom boom, the company generated annual revenue in excess of $100m (for the year ended 31 December 2000), but in following years failed to sustain this level of income. The company was reported to have 10,000 customers worldwide, including a majority of the Fortune 500 companies. The company's shares were traded on NASDAQ under the symbol NETM.

Helder Antunes served as NetManage's Director of Engineering from 1993 to 1998.

The company was also involved in launching one of the first Internet service provider in Israel, NetVision.

== Products ==
- OnWeb – Legacy modernization, integration and webification software, which enables companies to improve the use of existing hardware for important applications. OnWeb turns command line applications into graphical, Web-based applications and transforms processes locked in previous software into components that can be reused. This is accomplished without changing the logic of the existing application, lowering the risk and cost of deploying new processes.
- RUMBA – Terminal emulation and host connectivity product. RUMBA provides users a Windows environment in which to access and use information from a broad range of host systems including IBM mainframes, IBM iSeries (AS/400), Hewlett-Packard, UNIX, and VAX computers. It provides all the core functionality of a Windows-based emulator, from multi-session support and printer emulation to a variety of file transfer and local graphics options.
- Librados – a Java JCA Application Integration Adapter
- SOA Planner – Intelligent service modeling and planning solution
- Ecco Pro – a personal information management software program
- Relay Gold – a terminal emulator software program
- Z-Mail, a cross-platform standards-based email client which was bought from Network Computing Devices
- Chameleon UNIX Link – A set of utilities (X server, NFS client/server, terminal emulator, etc.) to connect Windows to a UNIX machine

== Acquisitions ==
- ServiceSoft Ltd – acquired in 1994
- Arabesque Software – acquired in 1994
- Syzygy Communications – acquired in 1995
- AGE Logic – acquired in 1995
- MaxInfo – acquired in 1996
- NetSoft – acquired in 1997
- FTP Software – acquired in 1998
- Relay Technology – acquired in 1999
- Wall Data, Inc, developer of RUMBA – acquired in 1999
- Simware, developer of OnWeb – acquired in 1999
- Librados – acquired in 2004
