= Timeline of Intel =

This is a timeline of Intel, one of the world's largest semiconductor chip makers.

== Timeline ==
Year	Month and date	Event type	Details
1968	July 18	Company logo	Intel is founded by Robert Noyce and Gordon Moore, who had both left Fairchild Semiconductor.
1969	May 1	Competition	Advanced Micro Devices is founded by Jerry Sanders. This company would become the second-largest supplier and only significant rival to Intel in the market for x86-based microprocessors.
1970	October	Products	Intel comes out with its 3rd product, the Intel 1103, which put Intel on the map.
1971	October 13	Company	Intel goes IPO at a price of $23.50 a share. At 350,000 shares, this sums to a total of $8.225M. Intel becomes one of the very first companies to be listed on the then-newly established National Association of Securities Dealers Automated Quotations (NASDAQ) stock exchange.
1971	November 15	Product	Intel launches its first microprocessor, the 4004.
1972	April	Product	Intel announces the first 8-bit microprocessor, the 8008.
1974	April	Product	Intel launches the Intel 8080 microprocessor, the first general-purpose microprocessor, featuring 4,500 transistors. This finally kickstarts computer development.
1976		Product	Intel launches the Intel MCS-48 series of microcontrollers, the world's first microcontrollers (which combine a CPU with memory, peripherals, and input-output functions).
1978	June	Product	Intel introduces the 8086 16-bit microprocessor, which becomes the industry standard (for the x86 instruction set).
1979	November	Product	Intel launches "Operation Crush", a campaign to establish the 8086 as the standard for the 16-bit microprocessor market (which was competing with the technically superior Motorola 68000). This finally convinces IBM to adopt the 8086 in its upcoming personal computer.
1980		Product	Intel and Xerox introduce the cooperative Ethernet project.
1982	February 1	Product	Intel launches the 16-bit Intel 286 microprocessor, which features 134,000 transistors and is built into many PCs.
1983		Product	Intel launches CHMOS technology, which increases chip performance while decreasing power consumption.
1984		Product	Intel announces the world's first CHMOS DRAMs, which have densities as high as 256K.
1985		Product	Intel enters the parallel supercomputer business and introduces the iPSC/1.
1985	October	Product	Intel launches (and sole-sources) the 80386 processor, a 32-bit chip that incorporates 275K transistors and can run multiple software programs at once.
1986	September	Partnerships	Compaq buys the 386 for its Deskpro personal computer. Compaq was one of several IBM clones that would adopt Intel processors, which shifted control of the IBM PC-compatible computer industry from IBM to Intel.
1986		Legal	The US-Japan Semiconductor Trade Agreement is signed, opening up Japanese markets to US semiconductor markets.
1989	April 10	Product	Intel introduces the 80486 microprocessor, which it sole-sources for 4 years. This offers backwards compatibility.
1989	October	Marketing	Intel launches the "Red X" marketing campaign by discrediting its original 16-bit and 8-bit products, in order to encourage more people to adopt 32-bit computing.
1990	June 3	Team	Robert Noyce suddenly dies from a heart attack.
1990	November	Competition	Intel loses its suit against AMD. This loss allows AMD to create clones of the 386 processor.
1991	Spring	Product	Intel decides that it will stick with CISC architecture, and cuts off support for RISC architecture, which was internally developed by Les Kohn.
1991		Company	Intel starts the Intel Inside marketing campaign.
1992		Competition	Intel becomes the top-ranked seller for semiconductor sales. It has retained its top ranking ever since.
1993	March	Product	Intel launches the Pentium processor, which has 3.1 million transistors, initial speeds of 60 MHz, features an integrated floating-point unit, and is built on a 0.8 micron bi-CMOS process.
1994	December	Product	Intel suffers a public relations disaster when CNN publicized the story that there was a flaw in the way that the Pentium chip did division. Intel argued that the flaw was irrelevant, but then IBM halted shipments of Pentium-based computers, forcing Intel to reverse course and offer a no-questions-asked return policy.
1995	November 1	Product	Intel launches the Pentium Pro processor, a high-performance chip targeted for 32-bit workstations.
1996	October 22	Product	Intel launches the Pentium MMX product line.
1997	May 7	Product	Intel launches the Pentium II line of processors, which is Intel's sixth-generation microarchitecture (P6).
1998	April 1	Company	Intel wins sponsorship rights to the Westinghouse Science Talent Search.
1998	June 29	Product	Intel rolls out the Intel Pentium II Xeon processor, Intel's new high-end solution for the workstation and server markets.
1998	August 24	Product	Intel launches the first processor for the budget PC market segment, the Intel Celeron processor.
1999	February 26	Product	Intel launches the Pentium III generation of microprocessors, which features the addition of the SSE instruction set (to accelerate floating point and parallel calculations).
1999	October	Company	The Dow Jones Industrial Average adds Intel to its list.
2000		Company	Intel launches Intel Research.
2000	November	Product	Intel introduces the Pentium 4 processor, with an initial speed of 1.5 GHz.
2001	May	Legal, competition	Intel and Advanced Micro Devices make a patent cross-license agreement between the companies.
2003	March	Product	Intel launches the Pentium M mobile processor, along with the Centrino processor technology for laptop PCs, which made wireless compatibility a standard for laptop computers.
2004	February	Product	Intel announces that it will implement its first 64-bit processor, and releases the Nocona in June 2004.
2005	May 25	Product	Intel launches the Pentium D dual-core processor.
2005	June	Legal, competition	AMD files lawsuit against Intel, claiming that Intel engaged in unfair competition by offering rebates to Japanese PC manufacturers who agreed to eliminate or limit purchases of microprocessors made by AMD or a smaller manufacturer, Transmeta. In November 2009, Intel agrees to pay AMD $1.25 billion in a settlement.
2006	July 26	Product	Intel launches the Core 2 processor.
2007	November	Competition	Qualcomm launches the first Snapdragon system on a chip semiconductor product, which included the first 1 GHz processor for mobile phones. By 2011, Snapdragon achieves 50% market share of the smartphone processor market.
2008	March 2	Product	Intel announces the Intel Atom, a line of low-power, low-cost and low-performance x86 and x86-64 microprocessors that can be used for smartphones and tablets.
2008	August 10	Product	Intel announces the Nehalem microprocessor, which represents the new Core i7 brand of high-end microprocessors to replace the Core 2 microprocessors.
2009	November	Legal	Intel pays Advanced Micro Devices $1.25 billion in a settlement over AMD's assertion that Intel rewarded computer makers that used only Intel chips and punished those who bought from AMD.
2011	January	Product	Intel announces the Sandy Bridge series of Core microprocessors to replace Nehalem. Sandy Bridge microprocessors start out as quad-core.
2011	May	Product	Intel announces that it will put the first 3D transistors into high-volume production (the structure it invented is called "Tri-Gate").
2013	June	Product	Intel releases the next-generation lineup of desktop and mobile processors in the Core i3, i5, and i7 family – known as Haswell.
2013	September 10	Product	Intel announces the Intel Quark, a tiny chip that can power Internet of things and wearable devices.
2016	May 3	Product	Intel announces withdrawal from smartphone market.
2017		Acquisition	Intel acquired Mobileye, a leader in the development of computer vision and machine learning for autonomous driving, for $15.3 billion.
2018		Challenge	Intel security researchers discovered Spectre and Meltdown, two critical vulnerabilities that affected nearly all of the company’s processors.
2018		Product	Intel introduced 5G modem, bringing faster speeds and lower latency to mobile devices. It also introduced new processors; Core i9 and Xeon Scalable.
2019		Competition	Apple announced that it would no longer use Intel processors in its Mac computers. The company planned to switch to using its own ARM-based chips.
2020	September 2	Product logo	Intel and all its products (except the ones that were discontinued or never got a new logo) get a new logo.
2024	February 21	Product	Intel launched Intel Foundry as a more sustainable systems foundry business designed for the AI era.
2024	April	Competition	Intel becomes the worst-performing tech stock in the S&P 500, down 37% year-to-date.
2025	August	Event	The United States government purchased 433.3 million Intel shares at $20.47 per share, equivalent to a 9.9% stake.
