= FTP Software =

Defunct software company

FTP Software, Inc.
- Logo used from 1996 to 1998
- Industry: Software
- Founded: 1986; 40 years ago in Cambridge, Massachusetts
- Founders: James van Bokkelen; John Romkey; Nancy Connor; Roxanne van Bokkelen; Dave Bridgham
- Defunct: 1998; 28 years ago
- Fate: Acquired by NetManage Inc.
- Products: See § Products
- Website: ftp.com at the Wayback Machine (archived 1997-06-18)

FTP Software, Inc., was an American software company incorporated in 1986 by James van Bokkelen, John Romkey (co-author of the MIT PC/IP package), Nancy Connor, Roxanne van Bokkelen (née Ritchie), Dave Bridgham, and several other founding shareholders, who met at Toscanini's in Central Square after an email went out over the Bandykin mailing list looking for people interested in starting a company. Their main product was PC/TCP, a full-featured, standards-compliant TCP/IP package for DOS. The company was based in Andover, Massachusetts. It also had a number of offices throughout the United States and overseas.

They were acquired by competitor NetManage in 1998.

== Origins ==
Logo used from the early 1990s to 1996

The core open-source software was developed at MIT starting in 1982 as the PC/IP project, a project to make PCs into first-class citizens on TCP/IP networks. This project began as a Telnet implemented by Louis J. Konopelski under the supervision of Jerome Saltzer. Later contributors to the PC/IP project included John Romkey, David Bridgham, David D. Clark, and Donald W. Gillies.

FTP Software was the first of many companies to name themselves after an Internet protocol. At the time the company was founded, the PC/IP software package was already being sold by Wollongong, 3Com and others, and so some of the inventors of PC/IP decided to exploit their own product. After Donald W. Gillies produced a full-function multi-connection TCP and compatible SMTP for his bachelor's thesis, a mail proxy, it became possible to offer an FTP implementation - which requires two concurrent TCPs. This software, known as "ntcp" (new TCP) in the source tree, could support seven connections on a 128KB IBM PC-XT, and could interoperate with ten different operating systems. The multi-connection TCP languished in the source tree for two years before the FTP founders chose to make it the core of FTP Software, setting the company apart from the other competitors in this space, which were not actively improving PC/IP and were not willing to implement the FTP protocol based upon "ntcp".

== Fate ==
Initially PC/TCP's protocol stacks and network interface drivers were linked into individual application executables, as with PC/IP. By 1990, all PC/TCP applications shared a TSR kernel, which itself (initially) used built-in network interface drivers. By 1991, John Romkey's TSR PC/TCP Packet Driver specification had largely replaced the built-in drivers.

The company had a good run, with a valuation of over $1 billion at one point, but suffered greatly from both internal and external pressures. It had grown rapidly and repeatedly moved physically farther away from its roots at MIT. The founders, though technically adept, were inexperienced as managers. They suffered from in-fighting, epitomized in a public divorce between two of the founders.

The company went public in 1994, and maintained profitable growth through 1995, as a dominant supplier of TCP stacks for x86-based machines. They spent two to three million dollars per year on advertising. When Microsoft included a TCP stack at no extra cost in Windows 95 (as has become standard with all operating systems), FTP lost a significant revenue source. Due to management (which by that time was mostly non-founders) failing to adequately prepare for the transition into supplying network-using applications, FTP was not able meet Wall Street's expectations and its stock price declined sharply.

In May 1996, FTP Software announced it was providing Microsoft with various technology for Internet Explorer 2.0 for Windows 3.1, including a PPP network, 16-bit email client, and other technology.

In 1998, FTP Software was bought out by former rival NetManage. The deal was controversial, with some shareholders claiming it was not in their interest since the sale price was less than the amount in FTP's bank account.

== Comparison with other products ==
An extensive history of TCP on personal computers was published in 1998 by Steven Baker for Unix Review.

== Products ==
- InterDrive
- OnNet
- LanWatch
- PC/BIND
- PC/TCP
- SNMP Tools
- WinSNMP

== See also ==
- PC/TCP Packet Driver
- Crynwr Software
