= Vendor Independent Messaging =

Windows email API

VIM (Vendor Independent Messaging) was a standard API for applications to integrate with e-mail on Windows 3.x, proposed by Lotus, Borland, IBM & Novell in the early 1990s. Its main competitor was Microsoft's MAPI, which was the eventual winner of the MAPI v. VIM war. Ultimately, the choice of VIM or MAPI did not make a huge difference: bridges meant that an MAPI client could access a VIM provider and vice versa, and the rise of Internet e-mail in the mid-1990s rendered the panoply of proprietary e-mail systems which VIM and MAPI were meant to cater to largely irrelevant.
