= Windows Driver Kit =

Software tool for developing device drivers

- Developer: Microsoft
- Release: 1992; 34 years ago
- Stable release: 10.1.26100.2454 / November 27, 2024; 21 months ago
- Operating system: Microsoft Windows
- Available in: English
- License: Proprietary commercial software
- Website: docs.microsoft.com/en-us/windows-hardware/drivers/index

The Windows Driver Kit (WDK) is a software toolset from Microsoft that enables the development of device drivers for the Microsoft Windows platform. It includes documentation, samples, build environments, and tools for driver developers. A complete toolset for driver development also need the following: a compiler Visual Studio, Windows SDK, and Windows HLK.

== Forms of distribution ==
The Windows Driver Kit is available in several forms, depending on development and build requirements:

- Windows Driver Kit (WDK) – the primary MSI based installation that integrates with Microsoft Visual Studio and includes headers, libraries, documentation, and driver development and testing tools.
- Enterprise Windows Driver Kit (EWDK) – a standalone, self-contained environment that includes the build tools, headers, and libraries needed to build Windows drivers without installing Visual Studio. The EWDK is commonly used in automated build systems or in environments that require an isolated toolchain.
- WDK NuGet packages – package-based distributions of WDK components that can be consumed through NuGet in Visual Studio. These packages allow developers to reference driver development headers and libraries on a per‑project basis without installing the full WDK. They can also be used in continuous integration and continuous deployment (CI/CD) environments to automate driver builds and validation.

== History ==
Previously, the WDK was known as Device Development Kit (DDK) for Windows 3.x and Windows 9x. It supported the development of VxD drivers. Later versions for Windows NT and Windows 98 SE and ME were called Driver Development Kit (DDK) and supported Windows Driver Model (WDM) development. It got its current name when Microsoft released Windows Vista and added the following previously separated tools to the kit: Installable File System Kit (IFS Kit), Driver Test Manager (DTM), though DTM was later renamed and removed from WDK again.

The DDK for Windows 2000 and earlier versions did not include a compiler; instead one had to install Visual C++ separately to compile drivers. From the version for Windows XP the DDK and later the WDK include a command-line compiler to compile drivers. One of the reasons Microsoft gave for including a compiler was that the quality of drivers would improve if they were compiled with the same version of the compiler that was used to compile Windows itself while Visual C++ is targeted to application development and has a different product cycle with more frequent changes. The WDK 8.x and later series goes back to require installing a matched version of Visual Studio separately, but this time the integration is more complete in that you can edit, build and debug the driver from within Visual Studio directly.

== DDK versions ==
Version	Build number	Release date	Supported Driver Model
Windows 3.0 DDK		1990	VxD
Windows 3.1 DDK		1992	VxD
Windows NT 3.1 DDK		1993	NTDM
Windows NT 3.5 DDK		1994	NTDM
Windows NT 3.51 DDK	1025.1	July 1995	NTDM
Windows 95 DDK		October 1995	VxD
Windows 95 DDK a		June 1996	VxD
Windows 95 DDK b			VxD
Windows 95 DDK c (MSDN July 1998)		June 1998	VxD
Windows NT DDK (for Windows NT Workstation 3.51)		July 1996	NTDM
Windows NT DDK (for Windows NT Workstation 4.0)	1381.1	August 1996	NTDM
Windows 98 DDK		July 1998	VxD, WDM?
Windows 98 SE DDK		May 1999	VxD, WDM?
Windows 2000 DDK	2195.1	February 2000	WDM
Windows Me DDK		August 7, 2000	VxD only
Windows XP Driver Development Kit (DDK)	2600	September 21, 2001	WDM
Windows XP SP1 Driver Development Kit (DDK)	2600.1106	November 14, 2002	WDM
Windows Server 2003 DDK	3790	April 9, 2003	WDM
Windows Server 2003 with Service Pack 1 DDK	3790.1830	April 6, 2005	WDM

Windows NT DDK, Windows 98 DDK and Windows 2000 DDK are no longer made available by Microsoft because of Java-related settlements made by Microsoft with Sun Microsystems.

== WDK versions ==
Version	Build number	Release date	Develops drivers for	Visual Studio integration	Notes
Windows Driver Kit for Windows Vista	6000	November 29, 2006	Windows Vista	-	-
Windows Driver Kit – Server 2008 (x86, x64, ia64)	6001.18000	January 1, 2008	Windows XP SP1 – Vista SP1, Windows Server 2000 SP4 – 2008	-	-
Windows Driver Kit – Server 2008 (x86, x64, ia64)	6001.18001	April 1, 2008	Windows XP SP1 – Vista SP1, Windows Server 2000 SP4 – 2008	-	-
Windows Driver Kit – Server 2008 Release SP1 (x86, x64, i64)	6001.18002	December 8, 2008	Windows XP SP1 – Vista SP1, Windows Server 2000 SP4 – 2008 SP1	-	-
Windows Driver Kit 7.0.0	7600.16385.0	August 6, 2009	Windows 7, Windows Server 2008 R2	-	-
Windows Driver Kit 7.1.0	7600.16385.1	February 26, 2010	Windows XP SP3 – 7, Windows Server 2003 SP1 – 2008 R2	-	
Windows Driver Kit 8.0	8.59.25584	August 15, 2012	Windows 7 – 8, Windows Server 2008 R2 – 2012	Visual Studio 2012	Downloads before 8/17/2012 had a bug in WDF co-installer
Windows Driver Kit 8.1	8.100.26638	September 16, 2013	Windows 7 – 8.1, Windows Server 2008 R2 – 2012 R2	Visual Studio 2013	-
Windows Driver Kit 8.1 Update	8.100.26846	August 20, 2014	Windows 7 – 8.1 Update, Windows Server 2008 R2 – 2012 R2	Visual Studio 2013	-
Windows Driver Kit 10, Version 1507	10.0.26639	July 2015	Windows 7 SP1 – 10	Visual Studio 2015 RTM – Update 3	-
Windows Driver Kit 10, Version 1511	10.0.10586	November 2015	Windows 7 SP1 – 10 Version 1511	Visual Studio 2015 Update 1 – 3	Windows 10 November Update
Windows Driver Kit 10, Version 1607	10.0.14393	August 2016	Windows 7 SP1 – 10 Version 1607 (Excludes Win10 Version 1507 & 1511)	Visual Studio 2015 Update 3	Windows 10 Anniversary Update
Windows Driver Kit 10, Version 1703	10.0.15063	April 2017	Windows 7 SP1 – 10 (Version 1607 & 1703 only), Windows Server 2008 R2 – 2016	Visual Studio 2017 Ver.15.1	Windows 10 Creators Update
Windows Driver Kit 10, Version 1709	10.0.16299	October 2017		Visual Studio 2017 Ver.15.4	Windows 10 Fall Creators Update
Windows Driver Kit 10, Version 1803	10.0.17134	April 2018			Windows 10 April 2018 Update
Windows Driver Kit 10, Version 1809	10.0.17763	October 2018			Windows 10 October 2018 Update
Windows Driver Kit 10, Version 1903	10.0.18362.1	April 2019	Windows 7 SP1 – 10 (Version 1607 to 1903), Windows Server 2008 R2 SP1 – 2019	Visual Studio 2019 Ver.16	Windows 10 May 2019 Update
Windows Driver Kit 11, Version 25H2	10.0.26100.6584	November 2025	Windows 10, Windows Server 2016	Visual Studio 2022 Ver.17	Windows 11 Nov 2025 Update

== See also ==
- Windows Driver Frameworks
- Windows Driver Model
- Windows Logo Kit
