= Timeline of Microsoft =

This is a timeline of Microsoft, a multinational computer technology corporation.

== Full timeline of Microsoft ==
| Year | Month and date | Event type | Details |
|---|---|---|---|
| 1972 | N/A | Company | Bill Gates and Paul Allen first founded Traf-O-Data, which only existed from 1972 until 1975. |
| 1975 | April 4 | Company | Bill Gates and Paul Allen founded Microsoft. As a result of Microsoft's founding, Traf-O-Data became defunct. |
| 1975 | April 4 | Products | Microsoft released its first product which is called the Altair BASIC. |
| 1978 | November 1 | International | The company's first international office was founded on November 1, 1978, in Japan, entitled "ASCII Microsoft" (now called "Microsoft Japan"). |
| 1980 | August | Products | Microsoft signs a contract with IBM to develop an operating system for IBM's first personal computer. This, in turn, was the beginning for both the Bundling of Microsoft Windows, and Wintelism, as IBM personal computers and Intel were also bundled with each other. |
| 1980 | August | Products | Having purchased a license for Version 7 Unix from AT&T in 1979, Microsoft announced on August 25, 1980, that it would make it available for the 16-bit microcomputer market, named Xenix. |
| 1981 | July 27 | Products | Microsoft buys the rights for QDOS from Seattle Computer Products (without telling SCP that it had a lucrative contract with IBM). This would later become MS-DOS. |
| 1981 | August 12 | Company | IBM announces the release of the IBM Personal Computer, which becomes the dominant personal computer. As DOS was the only operating system available on the PC when it was introduced in New York City, this paves way to the future domination by the MS-DOS operating system. |
| 1982 | April | International | Microsoft formally launches its International Division and sets up subsidiaries in Europe and elsewhere, finding local agents to handle its business interests |
| 1982 | November | Products | Microsoft releases Microsoft Flight Simulator version 1.0, and marks the beginning of one of the longest-running PC video game series of all time. |
| 1983 | January | Products | Compaq releases its first PC-compatible machine with IBM compatible clones, which hurt IBM but helped Microsoft (as it had to license DOS from Microsoft), but any application developed to run on the PC could still run on Compaq machines. |
| 1983 | January 26 | Competition | Lotus Development releases Lotus 1-2-3, a spreadsheet program that becomes the IBM PC's first killer application, and which established the spreadsheet standard for the PC. By the late 1980s, it would eventually lose out to Microsoft Excel. |
| 1983 | May 30 | Products | Microsoft announces Multi-Tool Word, which later becomes Microsoft Word. |
| 1983 | November 10 | Products | Bill Gates first introduced the first version of Microsoft Windows and it is planned to be released 2 years later. |
| 1984 | January 24 | Competition | Steve Jobs introduces the original Macintosh, the first successful mass-market computer with a graphical user interface. Microsoft would later adopt many of its features into Windows. |
| 1985 | September | Products | Microsoft releases Microsoft Excel, which would compete with, and later overtake, Lotus 1-2-3. |
| 1985 | November 20 | Products | Microsoft launches the first version of its Windows operating system, Windows 1.0, which runs on top of MS-DOS and had a primitive GUI. |
| 1986 | February | Company | Microsoft moves its headquarters to a suburban campus in Redmond, Washington. |
| 1986 | March 13 | Company | Microsoft goes public with an IPO, raising $61 million at $21 a share. |
| 1987 | April 2 | Products | Microsoft and IBM announce OS/2. |
| 1987 | December 9 | Products | Microsoft releases Windows 2.0. |
| 1988 | March | Competition, Legal | Apple sues Microsoft, contending that Microsoft's Windows 2.03 program violated Apple's copyrights on the Macintosh interface. |
| 1990 | May 22 | Products | Microsoft launches Windows 3.0. It gives the user virtual memory, improved graphics, and the ability to multitask. |
| 1990 | November 19 | Products | Microsoft releases Microsoft Office, which bundles together Microsoft Word, Microsoft Excel, and Microsoft PowerPoint for the first time. |
| 1991 | September | Company | Microsoft creates Microsoft Research. It declares that it would support research without regard to product cycles. |
| 1992 | April 6 | Products | Microsoft releases Windows 3.1. |
| 1993 | March 22 | Products | Microsoft releases Microsoft Encarta, the first multimedia encyclopedia designed for a computer. |
| 1993 | July 27 | Products | Microsoft releases Windows NT 3.1, the first version of Windows available only to business users. |
| 1994 | September 24 | Products | Microsoft releases Windows NT 3.5. |
| 1995 | May 30 | Products | Microsoft releases Windows NT 3.51, the last version of Windows to not have a Start Menu. |
| 1995 | August 24 | Products | Microsoft releases Windows 95, which features a new interface with a novel start button. Microsoft also debuted The Microsoft Network, a search engine and web portal for a wide variety of products and services. |
| 1995 | December 15 | Products | Microsoft announces partnership with NBC (National Broadcasting Company) to create a new 24-hour cable news television station, MSNBC. |
| 1996 | October 22 | Company | Microsoft launches Expedia, an online travel company, as its first Internet property. |
| 1996 | May | Products | Microsoft launches the Internet Gaming Zone, which would later become the MSN Gaming Zone. |
| 1997 | August 6 | Competition, Partnerships | Apple Inc announces that it will enter in a partnership with Microsoft. Microsoft releases Microsoft Office for Macintosh, ships Internet Explorer as the default browser for the Macintosh, and invests $150 million in Apple. |
| 1998 | June 25 | Products | Microsoft releases Windows 98. It includes support for USB devices, back and forward navigation buttons, the address bar in Windows Explorer, and the Windows Driver Model. |
| 1998 | N/A | International | Microsoft launches its Indian headquarters, which becomes its second-largest after its US headquarters. |
| 1998 | May 18 | Legal | United States v. Microsoft Corp., an antitrust trial, begins against Microsoft, with the US Department of Justice suing Microsoft for illegally thwarting competition in order to protect and extend its software (for reasons including bundling Internet Explorer with Microsoft Windows and requiring personal computer manufacturers to agree to adopt a uniform "boot-up" or "first screen" sequence specified by Microsoft). |
| 1999 | July 22 | Products | Microsoft releases MSN Messenger, an IM client. |
| 2000 | January 13 | Team | Bill Gates hands over his CEO position to Steve Ballmer. |
| 2000 | September 14 | Products | Microsoft releases Windows ME. It has improved support for digital media. |
| 2001 | May | Acquisitions | Microsoft acquires Ensemble Studios. |
| 2001 | October 25 | Products | Microsoft releases Windows XP. |
| 2001 | November 15 | Products | Microsoft launches the first Xbox. |
| 2002 | February 13 | Products | Microsoft launches .NET, including Visual Studio .NET and the .NET Framework, a development platform for building XML web services and applications. |
| 2002 | November 1 | Legal | The Department of Justice reaches an agreement with Microsoft to settle the United States v. Microsoft Corp. case. The proposed settlement required Microsoft to share its application programming interfaces with third-party companies and appoint a panel of three people who will have full access to Microsoft's systems, records, and source code for five years in order to ensure compliance. |
| 2003 | June 23 | Products | Microsoft announces Windows Mobile. |
| 2005 | November 22 | Products | Microsoft launches the Xbox 360. |
| 2006 | May 14 | Company | Microsoft launches adCenter, an online advertising service that provides pay per click advertising. Until then, all the ads displayed on the MSN search engine were supplied by Overture (and later Yahoo!). |
| 2007 | January 30 | Products | Microsoft releases Windows Vista to the general public. and was made available for purchase and download from Microsoft's website. |
| 2008 | June 27 | Team | Bill Gates retires as chief software architect and devotes more of his time to philanthropy. |
| 2008 | September 2 | Competition | Google launches Google Chrome, a browser that would cut into the web browser operating share of Internet Explorer. |
| 2009 | October 22 | Products | Microsoft launches Windows 7 to the general public. |
| 2009 | May 28 | Products | Microsoft unveils Microsoft Bing, a search engine to replace MSN. |
| 2010 | February | Products | Microsoft launches Microsoft Azure, its foray into cloud computing. |
| 2010 | March | Competition | Google lifts censorship on issues sensitive to the Chinese government, and is blocked by China, allowing the way for domination by alternative search engines, including Baidu. |
| 2010 | October 12 | Products | Microsoft ends mainstream support for Windows Mobile 5.0, marking the end of mainstream support for the older Windows Mobile platform. |
| 2011 | May 10 | Acquisitions | Microsoft acquires Skype for $8.5 billion. |
| 2012 | October 26 | Products | Microsoft launches Microsoft Surface, a series of Windows-based personal computing devices designed and manufactured by Microsoft under its hardware division. |
| 2012 | October 26 | Products | Microsoft releases Windows 8, featuring a redesigned user interface, the Windows Store, and support for touch-based devices. |
| 2013 | September | Acquisitions | Microsoft acquires Nokia in an attempt to expand its presence in mobile. |
| 2013 | October 17 | Products | Microsoft releases Windows 8.1, a free update to Windows 8 that adds new features and improvements. |
| 2013 | November 22 | Products | Microsoft launches the Xbox One. |
| 2013 | December 13 | Competition | Valve announces SteamOS, an operating system to compete with Windows. |
| 2014 | February 4 | Team | Satya Nadella succeeded Steve Ballmer as CEO of Microsoft. |
| 2014 | April | Products | Microsoft announces Cortana, an intelligent personal assistant. |
| 2014 | September | Company | Microsoft reassigns half of its staff in Microsoft Research to a new group called MSR NeXT, to focus on products with greater impact to the company rather than pure research. |
| 2014 | September | Products | The Windows Insider program is announced, which allows users to test Windows 10 and provide feedback to Microsoft developers. As of 2015, the program had over 7 million users. |
| 2014 | September | Acquisitions | Microsoft buys Mojang for $2.5 billion. |
| 2014 | October 31 | Services | Microsoft discontinues MSN Messenger and invites users to Skype. |
| 2015 | January 21 | Products | HoloLens, the world's first holographic headset is announced and Microsoft announces that Windows 10 will be a free upgrade for customers with Windows 7, Windows 8.1 or Windows Phone 8.1 (excluding enterprise). |
| 2015 | July 29 | Products | Microsoft releases Windows 10, which acts as a "universal" application architecture across multiple Microsoft product families. |
| 2015 | September 23 | International | Microsoft announces partnership with Baidu, making Baidu the default homepage for users of its Microsoft Edge browser in China, and which introduces Baidu search applications to Windows 10. |
| 2015 | October 26 | Retail | The first flagship Microsoft Store opens in New York City |
| 2015 | November 19 | Company | Microsoft, alongside ARM Holdings, Dell, Intel, Cisco Systems, and Princeton University, founded the OpenFog Consortium, to promote interests and development in fog computing. |
| 2016 | February 3 | Acquisitions | Microsoft announced to buy SwiftKey, a startup based out of London that makes keyboard apps for Android and iOS devices. |
| 2016 | February 24 | Acquisitions | Microsoft announces to buy Xamarin, a company that allows developers to build fully native apps across several platforms from a single shared code base. |
| 2016 | June 13 | Acquisitions | Microsoft announces the acquisition of LinkedIn at $26.2 billion ($60 per user). |
| 2016 | October 26 | Products | The Surface Studio and Surface Dial are announced |
| 2016 | November 2 | Products | Microsoft Teams, a cloud-based team collaboration tool, is launched as part of Office 365 |
| 2017 | June 29 | Acquisitions | Microsoft bought Israeli cloud startup Cloudyn, a company that helps customers manage their cloud billing across multiple clouds. |
| 2018 | August | Company | Microsoft partners with a Japanese company, Toyota Tsusho, to create fish farming tools using the Microsoft Azure application suite for IoT technologies that are related to the management of water. |
| 2019 | November 2 | Services | Microsoft releases a new version of Microsoft Edge. Also, a new logo of Microsoft Edge was introduced. |
| 2020 | February 12 | Products | Microsoft announced the beta version of Windows 10X. |
| 2020 | June 26 | Company | Microsoft has announced that all stores will be closed due to the COVID-19 pandemic. |
| 2020 | November 10 | Products | Microsoft launches the Xbox Series X and Series S. |
| 2021 | May 18 | Products | Microsoft cancels Windows 10X, which was planned to be released in 2021. The company said that they would be "accelerating the integration of key foundational 10X technology into other parts of Windows and products at the company". |
| 2021 | October 5 | Products | Microsoft releases Windows 11, the first major release since 2015, with a new logo. |
| 2023 | October 13 | Acquisitions | Microsoft acquires Activision Blizzard for $68.7 billion. Franchises include Warcraft, Diablo, Overwatch, Call of Duty, and Candy Crush. |
| 2025 | May 5 | Services | Skype is retired in favor of Microsoft Teams. |
