= Windows Hardware Lab Kit =

Automated testing software from Microsoft

- Developer: Microsoft
- Operating system: Microsoft Windows
- Platform: x86-32, x86-64 and ARM64
- Available in: English
- Website: learn.microsoft.com/en-us/windows-hardware/test/hlk/

The Windows Hardware Lab Kit (Windows HLK) is a test automation framework provided by Microsoft to certify devices for Windows. Earlier similarly released frameworks were called Windows Hardware Certification Kit (Windows HCK) and Windows Logo Kit (WLK).

It provides automated scheduling and execution of the driver tests that hardware vendors are required to pass in order to qualify to use the Microsoft Designed for Windows Logo. It also enables users to automate driver tests they have created themselves. These tests can be mixed and matched with the Logo tests provided by Microsoft to create a custom test pass, which enables organizations to use the DTM to validate drivers in any way they see fit.

== History ==
During the Windows 2000, XP, 2003 timeframe there was an old tool Hardware Compatibility Test (HCT) to certify devices. When Windows Vista was released the tool was replaced by Driver Test Manager (DTM) which can certify drivers for all then-supported platforms. At that time DTM was part of Windows Driver Kit (WDK). Later DTM was separated from WDK and changed its name to Windows Logo Kit (WLK). For Windows 8, the name was changed to Windows Hardware Certification Kit (Windows HCK), as announced at the //Build/ conference. Subsequently, its name was once again changed into Windows Hardware Lab Kit (Windows HLK) for Windows 10 release, intended for testing of hardware and drivers on Windows 10 platform. The Windows Hardware Certification Kit continues testing hardware on Windows 7, Windows 8 and Windows 8.1 (and their server products respectively) platforms.

== See also ==
- Inquisitor — free/open-source hardware testing framework.
- WHQL Testing — Windows Hardware Quality Labs testing.
