= APC (magazine) =

Australian magazine

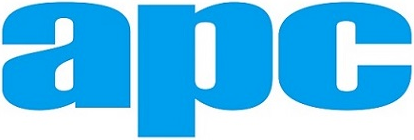

- Cover of issue 537 (October 2024)
- Editor: Dan Gardiner
- Categories: computer magazine
- Publisher: Future Australia
- Founder: Sean Howard
- First issue: May 1980
- Country: Australia
- Based in: Sydney
- Website: apcmag.com

APC (formerly known as Australian Personal Computer) is a computer magazine in Australia. It is published monthly by Future Australia.

APC was first published in May 1980 by Sean Howard and is the longest running computer-magazine in Australia.

The magazine's website publishes daily technology news, mostly separate from the printed magazine.

The magazine was bought from Bauer Media Group in 2013 by Future. Future subsequently incorporated PC & Tech Authority into APC after acquiring it (along with other computing assets) from Nextmedia in 2018.

In 2022, sister magazine TechLife (formerly PC User) ceased publication and merged into APC.

In October 2026, it was announced APC would cease publication as part of Future's exit from print publishing in Australia.
