= Piggybacking (Internet access) =

Unauthorized use of another's internet connection

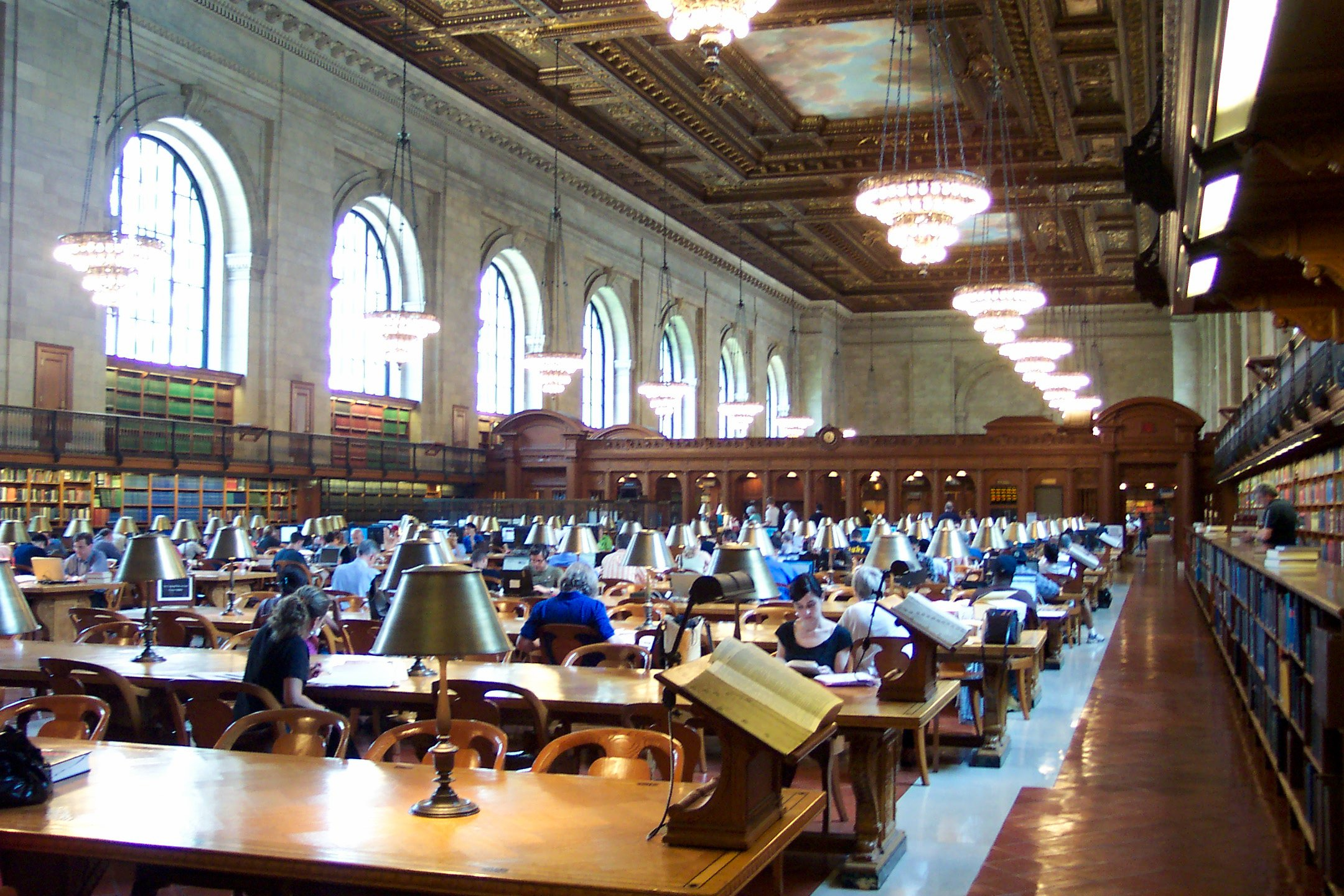
A Wi-Fi/reading room at the New York Public Library. While libraries often provide free Wi-Fi for patrons and visitors, many businesses and establishments do not.

Piggybacking on Internet access is the practice of establishing a wireless Internet connection by using another subscriber's wireless Internet access service without the subscriber's explicit permission or knowledge. It is a legally and ethically controversial practice, with laws that vary by jurisdiction around the world. While completely outlawed or regulated in some places, it is permitted in others.

A customer of a business providing hotspot service, such as a hotel or café, is generally not considered to be piggybacking, though non-customers or those outside the premises who are simply in reach may be. Many such locations provide wireless Internet access as a free or paid-for courtesy to their patrons or simply to draw people to the area. Others near the premises may be able to gain access.

Piggybacking is distinct from wardriving, which involves only the logging or mapping of the existence of access points.

== Background ==
Piggybacking has become a widespread practice in the 21st century due to the advent of wireless Internet connections and wireless access points. Computer users who either do not have their own connections or who are outside the range of their own might find someone else's by wardriving or luck and use that one.

However, those residing near a hotspot or another residence with the service have been found to have the ability to piggyback off such connections without patronizing these businesses, which has led to more controversy. While some may be in reach from their own home or nearby, others may be able to do so from the parking lot of such an establishment, from another business that generally tolerates the user's presence, or from the public domain. Others, especially those living in apartments or town houses, may find themselves able to use a neighbour's connection.

Wi-Fi hotspots, unsecured and secured, have been recorded to some degree with GPS-coordinates. Some sites host searchable databases or maps of the locations of user-submitted access points. The activity of finding and mapping locations has also been crowdsourced by many smartphone apps.

Long range antennas can be hooked up to laptop computers with an external antenna jack, which allows a user to pick up a signal from as far as several kilometers away. Since unsecured wireless signals can be found readily in most urban areas, laptop owners may find free or open connections almost anywhere. While 2.4 and 5 GHz antennas are commercially available and easily purchased from many online vendors, they are also relatively easy to make, even out of common waste such as a Cantenna. Laptops and tablets that lack external antenna jacks can rely on external Wi-Fi network cards, many requiring only USB, which the laptop can itself easily provide from its own battery.

== Reasons ==
There are many reasons why Internet users desire to piggyback on other's networks.

For some, the cost of Internet service is a factor. Many computer owners who cannot afford a monthly subscription to an Internet service, who only use it occasionally, or who otherwise wish to save money and avoid paying, will routinely piggyback from a neighbour or a nearby business, or visit a location providing this service without being a paying customer. If the business is large and frequented by many people, this may go largely unnoticed. Yet other piggybackers are regular subscribers to their own service, but are away from home when they wish to gain Internet access and do not have their own connection available at all or at an agreeable cost.

Often, a user will access a network completely by accident, as the network access points and computer's wireless cards and software are designed to connect easily by default. This is common when away from home or when the user's own network is not behaving correctly. Such users are often unaware that they are piggybacking, and the subscriber has not noticed. Regardless, piggybacking is difficult to detect unless the user can be viewed by others using a computer under suspicious circumstances.

Less often, it is used as a means of hiding illegal activities, such as downloading child pornography or engaging in identity theft. This is one main reason for controversy.

Network owners leave their networks unsecured for a variety of reasons. They may desire to share their Internet access with their neighbours or the general public or may be intimidated by the knowledge and effort required to secure their network while making it available to their own devices. Some wireless networking devices may not support the latest security mechanisms, and users must therefore leave their network unsecured. For example, the Nintendo DS and Nintendo DS Lite can only access wireless routers using the discredited WEP standard, however, the Nintendo DSi and Nintendo 3DS both support WPA encryption. Given the rarity of such cases where hosts have been held liable for the activities of piggybackers, they may be unaware or unconcerned about the risks they incur by not securing their network, or of a need for an option to protect their network.

Some jurisdictions have laws requiring residential subscribers to secure their networks (e.g., in France "négligence caractérisée" in HADOPI). Even where not required by law, landlords might request that tenants secure their networks as a condition of their lease.

== Views ==
Views on the ethics of piggybacking vary widely. Many support the practice by stating that it is harmless and benefits the piggybacker at no expense to others, but others criticize it with terms like "leeching," "mooching," or "freeloading." Different analogies are made in public discussions to relate the practice to more familiar situations. Advocates compare the practice to the following:

- sitting behind other passengers on a train and reading their newspaper over their shoulder.
- enjoying the music a neighbour is playing in one's backyard.
- using a drinking fountain.
- sitting in a chair put in a public place.
- reading from the light of a porch light or streetlamp.
- accepting an invitation to a party since unprotected wireless routers can be interpreted as being open to use.
- borrowing a cup of sugar.

Opponents to piggybacking compare the practice to the following:

- entering a home just because the door is unlocked.
- hanging on the outside of a bus to obtain a free ride.
- connecting one's own wire to a neighbour's house to obtain free cable TV service when the neighbour is a subscriber.

The piggybacker uses the connection paid for by another without sharing the cost. That is especially common in an apartment building in which many residents live within the normal range of a single wireless connection. Some residents can gain free Internet access while others pay. Many ISPs charge monthly rates, however, and so there is no difference in cost to the network owner.

Excessive piggybacking may slow the host's connection, with the host typically unaware of the reason for the reduction of speed. That is more of a problem if many persons are engaging in this practice, such as in an apartment or near a business.

Piggybackers may engage in illegal activity such as identity theft or child pornography without much of a trail to their own identity. That leaves network owners subject to investigation for crimes of which they are unaware. While persons engaging in piggybacking are generally honest citizens, a smaller number are breaking the law in that manner and so avoid identification by investigators. That, in particular, has led to some anti-piggybacking laws.

Some access points, when the factory default settings are used, are configured to provide wireless access to all who request it. Some commentators argue that those who set up access points without enabling security measures are offering their connection to the community. Many people intentionally leave their networks open to allow neighbours casual access, with some joining wireless community networks to share bandwidth freely. It has largely become good etiquette to leave access points open for others to use, just as someone expects to find open access points while on the road.

Jeffrey L. Seglin, an ethicist for the New York Times, recommends notifying network owners if they are identifiable, but he says there is nothing inherently wrong with accessing an open network and using the connection. "The responsibility for deciding whether others should be able to tap into a given access belongs squarely on the shoulders of those setting up the original connection."

Similarly, Randy Cohen, the author of The Ethicist column for The New York Times Magazine and National Public Radio, says that one should attempt to contact the owner of a regularly used network and offer to contribute to the cost. However, he points out that network owners can easily password protect their networks and quotes the attorney Mike Godwin to conclude that open networks likely represent indifference on the part of the network owner and so accessing them is morally acceptable, if it is not abused.

The policy analyst Timothy B. Lee (not to be confused with Tim Berners-Lee) writes in the International Herald Tribune that the ubiquity of open wireless points is something to celebrate. He says that borrowing a neighbour's Wi-Fi is like sharing a cup of sugar, and leaving a network open is just being a good neighbour.

Techdirt blogger Mike Masnick responded to an article in Time Magazine to express his disagreement with why a man was arrested for piggybacking a cafe's wireless medium. The man had been charged with breaking Title 18, Part 1, Chapter 47, of the United States Code, which states and includes anyone who "intentionally accesses a computer without authorization or exceeds authorized access." The writer himself is not sure what that title really means or how it applies to contemporary society since the code was established regarding computers and their networks during the Cold War era.

In the technical legality of the matter, Masnick believes the code was not broken because the access point owner did not secure the device specifically for authorized users. Therefore the device was implicitly placed into a status of "authorized." Lev Grossman, with Time Magazine, is on the side of most specialist and consumers, who believe the fault, if there is any, is mostly that of the network's host or owner.

An analogy commonly used in this arena of debate equates wireless signal piggybacking with entering a house with an open door. Both are supposed to be equatable, but the analogy is tricky, as it does not take into account unique differences regarding the two items in reference, which ultimately leave the analogy flawed.

The key to the flaw in the analogy is that with an unprotected access point, the default status is for all users to be authorized. An access point is an active device that initiates the announcement of its services and, if setup securely allows or denies authorization by its visitors.

A house door, on the other hand, has physical attributes that distinguish access to the house as authorized or unauthorized by its owner. Even with an open house door, it is plain whether one has been invited to that house by its owner and if entrance will be authorized or denied. A house owner's door is passive but has an owner who knows the risks of leaving their door open and house unprotected in the absence of the gate keeping presence. Equally, wireless access point owners should be aware that security risks exist when they leave their network unprotected. In that scenario, the owner has made the decision to allow the gatekeeper or access point to authorize all who attempt to connect because the gatekeeper was not told whom not to let in.

== Prevention ==
Laws do not have the physical ability to prevent such action from occurring, and piggybacking may be practiced with negligible detection.

The owner of any wireless connection has the ability to block access from outsiders by engaging wireless LAN security measures. Not all owners do so, and some security measures are more effective than others. As with physical security, choice is a matter of trade-offs involving the value of what is being protected, the probability of its being taken, and the cost of protection. An operator merely concerned with the possibility of ignorant strangers leeching Internet access may be less willing to pay a high cost in money and convenience than one who is protecting valuable secrets from experienced and studious thieves. More security-conscious network operators may choose from a variety of security measures to limit access to their wireless network, including:

- Hobbyists, computer professionals and others can apply Wired Equivalent Privacy (WEP) to many access points without cumbersome setup, but it offers little in the way of practical security against similarly studious piggybackers. It is cryptographically very weak, so an access key can easily be cracked. Its use is often discouraged in favor of other more robust security measures, but many users feel that any security is better than none or are unaware of any other. In practice, this may simply mean that nearby non-WEP networks are more accessible targets. WEP is sometimes known to slow down network traffic in the sense that the WEP implementation causes extra packets to be transmitted across the network. Some claim that "Wired Equivalent Privacy" is a misnomer, but it generally fits because wired networks are not particularly secure either.
- Wi-Fi Protected Access (WPA), as well as WPA2 and EAP are more secure than WEP. As of May 2013, 44.3 percent of all wireless networks surveyed by WiGLE use WPA or WPA2.
- MAC address authentication in combination with discretionary DHCP server settings allow a user to set up an "allowed MAC address" list. Under this type of security, the access point will only give an IP Address to computers whose MAC address is on the list. Thus, the network administrator would obtain the valid MAC addresses from each of the potential clients in their network. Disadvantages to this method include the additional setup. This method does not prevent eavesdropping traffic sent over the air (there is no encryption involved). Methods to defeat this type of security include MAC address spoofing, detailed on the MAC address page, whereby network traffic is observed, valid MACs are collected, and then used to obtain DHCP leases. It is also often possible to configure IP for a computer manually, ignoring DHCP, if sufficient information about the network is known (perhaps from observed network traffic).
- IP security (IPsec) can be used to encrypt traffic between network nodes, reducing or eliminating the amount of plain text information transmitted over the air. This security method addresses privacy concerns of wireless users, as it becomes much more difficult to observe their wireless activity. Difficulty of setting up IPsec is related to the brand of access point being used. Some access points may not offer IPsec at all, while others may require firmware updates before IPsec options are available. Methods to defeat this type of security are computationally intensive to the extent that they are infeasible using readily-available hardware, or they rely on social engineering to obtain information (keys, etc.) about the IPsec installation.
- VPN options such as tunnel-mode IPSec or OpenVPN can be difficult to set up, but often provide the most flexible, extendable security, and as such are recommended for larger networks with many users.
- Wireless intrusion detection systems can be used to detect the presence of rogue access points which expose a network to security breaches. Such systems are particularly of interest to large organizations with many employees.
- Flash a 3rd party firmware such as OpenWrt, Tomato or DD-WRT with support for RADIUS.
- Honeypot (computing) involves setting up a computer on a network just to see who comes along and does something on the open access point.

Disabling SSID broadcasts has been recommended in the past as a security measure, although it only hides networks superficially. MAC addresses of routers are still broadcast, and can be detected using special means. But worse, a device that once connected to a hidden SSID will continuously transmit probe requests for this SSID and is vulnerable to the Evil Twin attack. Therefore, SSID hiding can no longer be considered a security measure.

== Alternatives ==
There are several alternatives to piggybacking. Internet access is available on many data plans for smartphones and PDAs. Although it may have browsing limitations compared with Internet access from traditional Internet service providers for desktop or laptop computers, the Internet can be accessed anywhere there is an adequately strong data signal. Some mobile phone service providers offer mobile Internet service to other devices via a data connection from the mobile phone. Also known as tethering, one can interface to their phone either wirelessly using Bluetooth or Wi-Fi or wired via cable allowing access to the Internet anywhere there is a cell network signal.

Many jurisdictions have been experimenting with statewide, province-wide, county-wide or municipal wireless network access. On September 20, 2005, Google WiFi was announced as a municipal wireless mesh network in Mountain View, California. Baltimore County, Maryland provides free Wi-Fi access at government offices, libraries, and county facilities. This service was first provided in May 2007 in the central business district of the county seat, Towson, and gradually expanded throughout the remainder of the county. When the service was expanded to more public areas in 2014, Baltimore's acting chief technology officer, L. Jerome Mullen, remarked, "Projects like this are just the beginning of the opportunities that remain as we strengthen and expand the City's fiber optic network. We are building digital city infrastructure, and the possibilities are endless." In New York City, the Department of Parks and Recreation provides free Wi-Fi in parks across the city. BAI Communications was contracted by municipal public transportation authorities to install free Wi-Fi in underground subway stations in Toronto, Canada and in all 279 Manhattan, Queens, and Bronx underground subway stations in New York City. On January 8, 2013, Google and the Chelsea Improvement Company, a local public advocacy group, announced that they would install free Wi-Fi in the New York City neighborhood of Chelsea. New York Senator Chuck Schumer said at the press conference, "It's not very expensive at all—just a smidgeon of what Sandy cost. The mayor and I said maybe we could get this done for all of New York. We look forward to the day when all of New York has free Wi-Fi." On November 17, 2014, the mayor of New York City, Bill de Blasio, announced LinkNYC, an infrastructure project to create a free, encrypted, gigabit wireless network to cover New York City by replacing the city's payphones with Wi-Fi hotspots and web browser kiosks where free phone calls could also be made. These pilot programs may result in similar services being launched and interconnected nationwide.

Free Internet access hotspots have also been opened by a wide range of organisations. Companies sell hardware and network management services to establish hotspots. Other hotspot-based efforts have been launched with the intention of providing global, low-cost or free Internet access. Fon is a wireless router vendor which allows owners of its routers to share Internet access with other owners of Fon routers. Users who do not own a Fon router can also connect at a small price. Guifi.net is a free, open, international telecommunications community network organized and expanded by individuals, companies and administrations. On November 27, 2012, the Electronic Frontier Foundation and a coalition of nine other groups launched OpenWireless.org, an Internet activism project which seeks to increase Internet access by encouraging individuals and organisations to configure their wireless routers to offer a separate public wireless guest network or to open their network completely.

== See also ==
- Evil twin phishing
- Exposed terminal problem
- Fixed Wireless Data
- Hidden terminal problem
- IEEE 802.11
- Legality of piggybacking
- Local area network
- Wardriving
- Wireless network
