= Long-range Wi-Fi =

Wi-Fi used for network connectivity

Long-range Wi-Fi is used for low-cost, unregulated point-to-point computer network connections, as an alternative to other fixed wireless, cellular networks or satellite Internet access.

Wi-Fi networks have a range that's limited by the frequency, transmission power, antenna type, the location they're used in, and the environment. A typical wireless router in an indoor point-to-multipoint arrangement using 802.11n and a stock antenna might have a range of 50 metres (160 ft) or less. Outdoor point-to-point arrangements, through use of directional antennas, can be extended with many kilometers between stations.

== Introduction ==
Since the development of the IEEE 802.11 radio standard (marketed under the Wi-Fi brand name), the technology has become markedly less expensive and achieved higher bit rates. Long-range Wi-Fi especially in the 2.4 GHz band (as the shorter-range higher-bit-rate 5.8 GHz bands become popular alternatives to wired LAN connections) have proliferated with specialist devices. While Wi-Fi hotspots are ubiquitous in urban areas, some rural areas use more powerful longer-range transceivers as alternatives to cell (GSM, CDMA) or fixed wireless (Motorola Canopy and other 900 MHz) applications. The main drawbacks of 2.4 GHz vs. these lower-frequency options are:

- poor signal penetration – 2.4 GHz connections are effectively limited to line of sight or soft obstacles;
- far less range – GSM or CDMA cell phones can connect reliably at > 16 km (10 mi) distances; the range of GSM, imposed by the parameters of time-division multiple access, is set at 35 km (22 mi);
- few service providers commercially support long-distance Wi-Fi connections.

Despite a lack of commercial service providers, applications for long-range Wi-Fi have cropped up around the world. It has also been used in experimental trials in the developing world to link communities separated by difficult geography with few or no other connectivity options. Some benefits of using long-range Wi-Fi for these applications include:

- unlicensed spectrum – avoiding negotiations with incumbent telecom providers, governments or others;
- smaller, simpler, cheaper antennas – 2.4 GHz antennas have less than half the size of comparable-strength 900 MHz antennas and require less lightning protection;
- availability of proven free software like OpenWrt, DD-WRT, Tomato that works even on old routers (WRT54G, for instance) and makes modes like WDS, OLSR, etc., available to anyone, including revenue-sharing models for hotspots.

Nonprofit organizations operating widespread installations, such as forest services, also make extensive use of long-range Wi-Fi to augment or replace older communications technologies such as shortwave or microwave transceivers in licensed bands.

== Applications ==
=== Business ===
- Provide coverage to a large office or business complex or campus.
- Establish point-to-point link between large skyscrapers or other office buildings or airports.
- Bring Internet to remote construction sites or research labs.
- Simplify networking technologies by coalescing around a small number of Internet related widely used technologies, limiting or eliminating legacy technologies such as shortwave radio so these can be dedicated to uses where they actually are needed.
- Bring Internet to a home if regular cable/DSL cannot be hooked up at the location.
- Bring Internet to a vacation home or cottage on a remote mountain or on a lake.
- Bring Internet to a yacht or large seafaring vessel.
- Share a neighborhood Wi-Fi network.

=== Nonprofit and Government ===
- Connect widespread physical guard posts, e.g. for foresters, that guard a physical area, without any new wiring
- In tourist regions, fill in cell dead zones with Wi-Fi coverage, and ensure connectivity for local tourist trade operators
- Reduce costs of dedicated network infrastructure and improve security by applying modern encryption and authentication.

=== Military ===
- Connect critical opinion leaders, infrastructure such as schools and police stations, in a network local authorities can maintain
- Build resilient infrastructure with cheaper equipment that an impoverished war-torn region can afford, i.e. using commercial grade, rather than military-class network technology, which may then be left with the developed-world military
- Reduce costs and simplify/protect supply chains by using cheaper simpler equipment that draws less fuel and battery power; In general these are high priorities for commercial technologies like Wi-Fi especially as they are used in mobile devices.

=== Scientific research ===
- A long-range seismic sensor network was used during the Andean Seismic Project in Peru. A multi-hop span with a total length of 320 kilometres (200 miles) was crossed with some segments around 30 to 50 kilometers (19 to 31 miles). The goal was to connect to outlying stations to UCLA in order to receive seismic data in real time.

== Large-scale deployments ==
The EHAS-@LIS project, funded by the European Commission between 2003 and 2006, supported the creation of the CuzcoSur network in Peru. This network connected rural health facilities with the Cuzco Hospital, enabling the rural facilities for telemedicine services, telephony and Internet connectivity. The whole network was based on long-range WiFi, with point-to-point links covering different distances, some longer than 40 km. Based on this experience, researchers from University Rey Juan Carlos (URJC) in Spain modelled and studied in depth the performance of IEEE 802.11 (the standard behind WiFi systems) for long-distance links.

The Technology and Infrastructure for Emerging Regions (TIER) project at University of California at Berkeley in collaboration with Intel, uses a modified Wi-Fi setup to create long-distance point-to-point links for several of its projects in the developing world. This technique, dubbed Wi-Fi over Long Distance (WiLD), is used to connect the Aravind Eye Hospital with several outlying clinics in Tamil Nadu state, India. Distances range from five to over fifteen kilometres (3–10 miles) with stations placed in line of sight of each other. These links allow specialists at the hospital to communicate with nurses and patients at the clinics through video conferencing. If the patient needs further examination or care, a hospital appointment can then be scheduled. Another network in Ghana links the University of Ghana, Legon campus to its remote campuses at the Korle bu Medical School and the City campus; a further extension will feature links up to 80 km (50 mi) apart.

The Tegola project of the University of Edinburgh is developing new technologies to bring high-speed, affordable broadband to rural areas beyond the reach of fibre. A 5-link ring connects Knoydart, the N. shore of Loch Hourne, and a remote community at Kilbeg to backhaul from the Gaelic College on Skye. All links pass over tidal waters; they range in length from 1 1/2 to 12 miles (2.4 to 19.3 km).

== Increasing range in other ways ==
=== Specialized Wi-Fi channels ===
In most standard Wi-Fi routers, the three standards, a, b and g, are enough. But in long-range Wi-Fi, special technologies are used to get the most out of a Wi-Fi connection. The 802.11-2007 standard adds 10 MHz and 5 MHz OFDM modes to the 802.11a standard, and extend the time of cyclic prefix protection from 0.8 μs to 3.2 μs, quadrupling the multipath distortion protection. Some commonly available 802.11a/g chipsets support the OFDM 'half-clocking' and 'quarter-clocking' that is in the 2007 standard, and 4.9 GHz and 5.0 GHz products are available with 10 MHz and 5 MHz channel bandwidths. It is likely that some 802.11n D.20 chipsets will also support 'half-clocking' for use in 10 MHz channel bandwidths, and at double the range of the 802.11n standard.

==== 802.11n and MIMO ====
Preliminary 802.11n working became available in many routers in 2008. This technology can use multiple antennas to target one or more sources to increase speed. This is known as MIMO, Multiple Input Multiple Output. In tests, the speed increase was said to only occur over short distances rather than the long range needed for most point-to-point setups. On the other hand, using dual antennas with orthogonal polarities along with a 2x2 MIMO chipset effectively enable two independent carrier signals to be sent and received along the same long-distance path.

=== Power increase or receiver sensitivity boosting ===
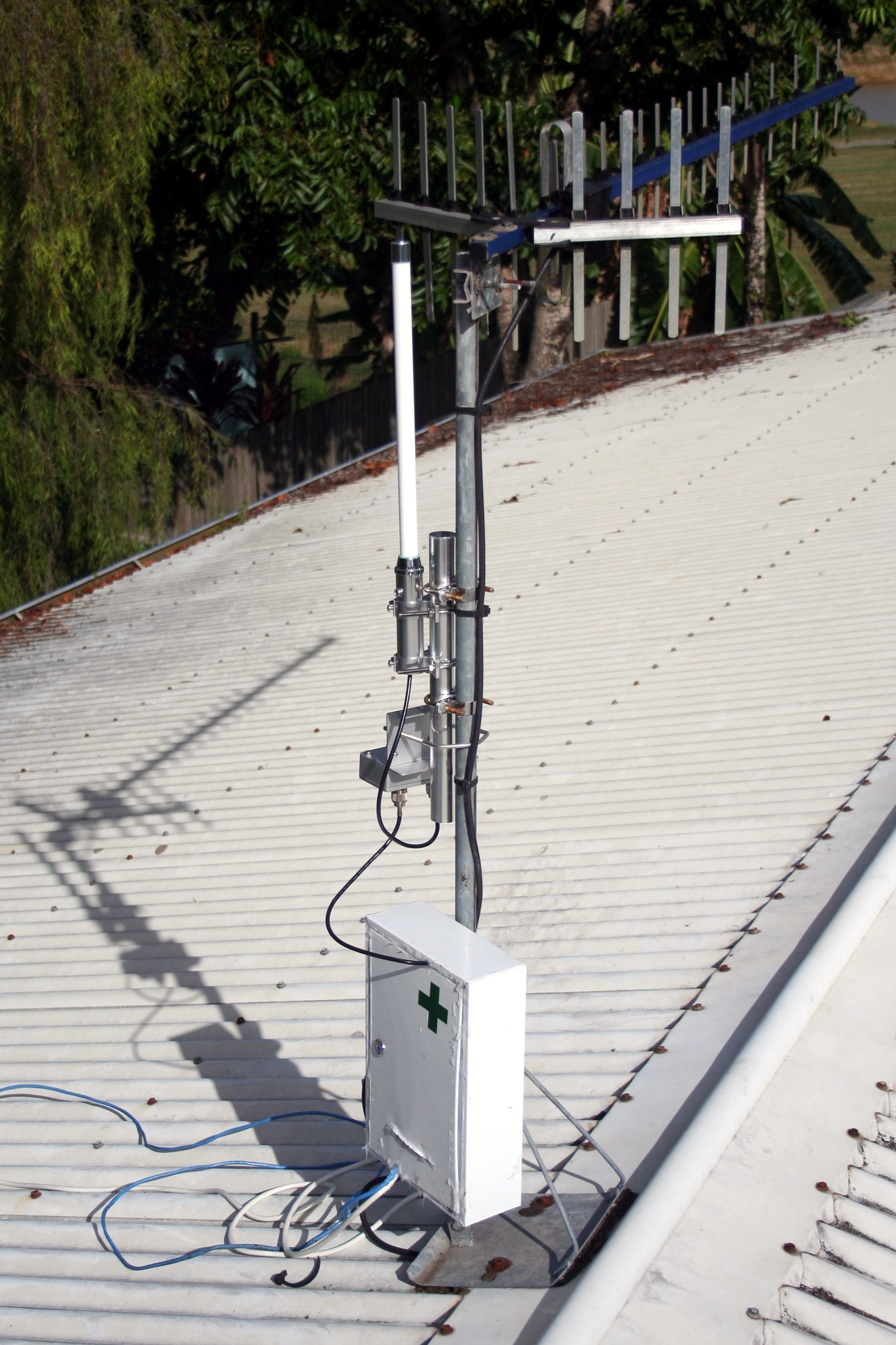
A rooftop 1 watt Wi-Fi amp, feeding a simple vertical antenna on the left.

Another way of adding range uses a power amplifier. Commonly known as "range extender amplifiers" these small devices usually supply around 1/2 watt of power to the antenna. Such amplifiers may give more than five times the range to an existing network. Every 3 dB gain doubles the effective output power. An antenna receiving 1 watt of power, and 6 dB gain would have an effective power of 4 watts.

=== Higher gain antennas and adapter placement ===
Specially shaped directional antennas can increase the range of a Wi-Fi transmission without a drastic increase in transmission power. High gain antenna may be of many designs, but all allow transmitting a narrow signal beam over greater distance than a non-directional antenna, often nulling out nearby interference sources. Such "WokFi" techniques typically yield gains more than 10 dB over the bare system; enough for line of sight (LOS) ranges of several kilometers (miles) and improvements in marginal locations.

=== Protocol hacking ===
The standard IEEE 802.11 protocol implementations can be modified to make them more suitable for long distance, point-to-point usage, at the risk of breaking interoperability with other Wi-Fi devices and suffering interference from transmitters located near the antenna. These approaches are used by the TIER project.

In addition to power levels, it is also important to know how the 802.11 protocol acknowledges each received frame. If the acknowledgement is not received, the frame is re-transmitted. By default, the maximum distance between transmitter and receiver is 1.6 km (1 mi). On longer distances the delay will force retransmissions. On standard firmware for some professional equipment such as the Cisco Aironet 1200, this parameter can be tuned for optimal throughput. OpenWrt, DD-WRT and all derivatives of it also enable such tweaking. In general, open source software is vastly superior to commercial firmware for all purposes involving protocol hacking, as the philosophy is to expose all radio chipset capabilities and let the user modify them. This strategy has been especially effective with low end routers such as the WRT54G which had excellent hardware features the commercial firmware did not support. As of 2011, many vendors still supported only a subset of chipset features that open source firmware unlocked, and most vendors actively encourage the use of open source firmware for protocol hacking, in part to avoid the difficulty of trying to support commercial firmware users attempting this.

Packet fragmentation can also be used to improve throughput in noisy/congested conditions. Although packet fragmentation is often thought of as something bad, and does indeed add a large overhead, reducing throughput, it is sometimes necessary. For example, in a congested situation, ping times of 30 byte packets can be excellent, while ping times of 1450 byte packets can be very poor with high packet loss. Dividing the packet in half, by setting the fragmentation threshold to 750, can vastly improve the throughput. The fragmentation threshold should be a division of the MTU, typically 1500, so should be 750, 500, 375, etc. However, excessive fragmentation can make the problem worse, since the increased overhead will increase congestion.

== Obstacles to long-range Wi-Fi ==
Methods that increase the range of a Wi-Fi connection may also make it fragile and volatile, due to various factors including:

=== Landscape interference ===
Obstacles are among the biggest problems when setting up a long-range Wi-Fi. Trees and forests attenuate the microwave signal, and hills make it difficult to establish line-of-sight propagation. Rain and wet foliage can decrease range further with extreme amounts of rain.

In a city, buildings will impact integrity, speed and connectivity. Steel frames and sheet metal in walls or roofs may partially or fully reflect radio signals, causing signal loss or multipath problems. Concrete or plaster walls absorb microwave signals significantly, reducing the total signal. Hospitals, with their extreme amounts of shielding, can require extensive planning to produce a viable network.

=== Tidal fading ===
When point-to-point wireless connections cross tidal estuaries or archipelagos, multipath interference from reflections over tidal water can be considerably destructive. The Tegola project uses a slow frequency-hopping technique to mitigate tidal fading.

=== 2.4 GHz interference ===
Microwave ovens in residences dominate the 2.4 GHz band and will cause "meal time perturbations" of the noise floor. There are many other sources of interference that aggregate into a formidable obstacle to enabling long-range use in occupied areas. Residential wireless phones, USB 3.0 Hubs, baby monitors, wireless cameras, remote car starters, and Bluetooth products are all capable of transmitting in the 2.4 GHz band.

Due to the intended nature of the 2.4 GHz band, there are many users of this band, with potentially dozens of devices per household. By its very nature, "long range" connotes an antenna system which can see many of these devices, which when added together produce a very high noise floor, whereby no single signal is usable, but nonetheless are still received. The aim of a long-range system is to produce a system which over-powers these signals and/or uses directional antennas to prevent the receiver "seeing" these devices, thereby reducing the noise floor.

== Notable links ==
=== Italy ===
The longest unamplified Wi-Fi link is a 304 km link achieved by CISAR (Italian Center for Radio Activities). New world record for long-range wireless broadband.

- it appears to be permanent from Monte Amiata (Tuscany) to Monte Limbara (Sardinia)
- frequency: 5765 MHz
- IEEE 802.11a (Wi-Fi), bandwidth 50 MHz
- data rates: of up to 5 Mbit/s
- Radio: Ubiquiti Networks AF-5X radios
- Wireless routers: Ubiquiti airFiber
- Length: 304 km (189 mi).
- Antenna is 120 cm (4') with handmade waveguide. 35 dBi estimated

=== Venezuela ===
Another notable unamplified Wi-Fi link is a 279 km (173 mi) link achieved by the Latin American Networking School Foundation.

- Pico del Águila – El Baúl Link.
- frequency: 2412 MHz
- link established in 2006
- IEEE 802.11 (Wi-Fi), channel 1, bandwidth 22 MHz
- Wireless routers: Linksys WRT54G, OpenWrt firmware at el Águila and DD-WRT firmware at El Baúl.
- Length: 279 km (173 mi).
- Parabolic dish antennas were used at both ends, recycled from satellite service.
- At El Aguila site an aluminum mesh reflector 2.74 m (9 ft) diameter, center-fed, at El Baúl a fiberglass solid reflector, offset-fed, 2.44 by 2.74 m (8 by 9 ft). On both ends the feeds were 12 dBi Yagis.
- Linksys WRT54G series routers fed the antennas with short LMR400 cables, so the effective gain of the complete antenna is estimated at 30 dBi.
- This is the largest known range attained with this technology, improving on a previous US record of 201 km (125 mi) achieved last year in U.S. The Swedish space agency attained 315 km (196 mi), but using 6 watt amplifiers to reach an overhead stratospheric balloon.

=== Peru ===
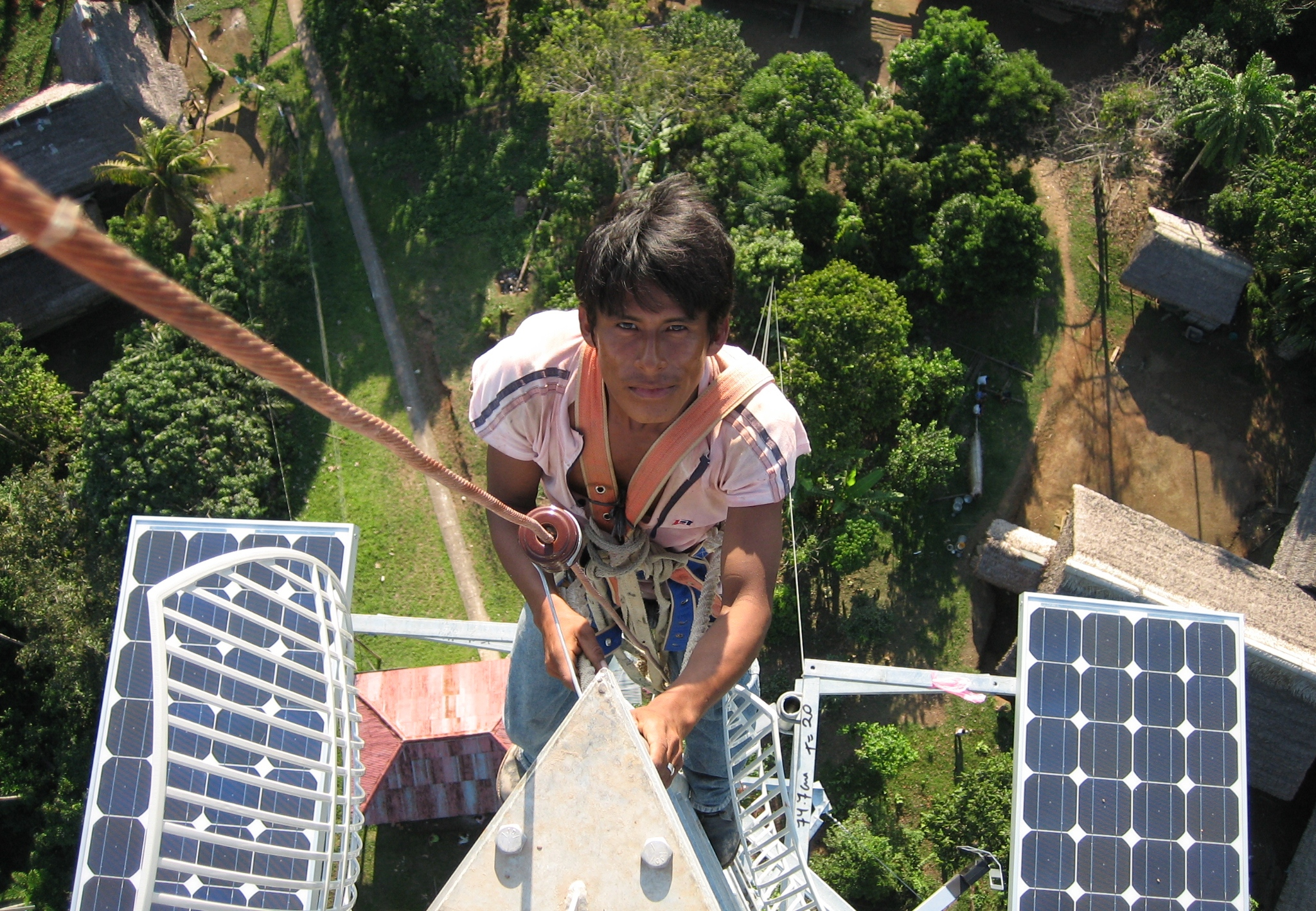
Antenna installation at Napo, Loreto (March 2007)

Loreto, in the jungle region of Peru, is the location of the longest Wi-Fi-based multihop network in the world. This network has been implemented by the Rural Telecommunications Research Group of the Pontificia Universidad Católica del Perú (GTR PUCP) in collaboration with the EHAS Foundation. The Wi-Fi chain goes through many small villages and takes seventeen hops to cover the whole distance. It begins in Cabo Pantoja's Health Post and finishes at downtown Iquitos. Its length is about 445 km (277 mi). The intervention zone was established in the lowland jungle with elevations under 500 meters (1600') above sea level. It is a flat zone and for this reason GTR PUCP installed towers with an average height of 80 meters (260').

- The link was established in 2007. GTR PUCP, the regional government of Loreto, and Vicariate San José de Amazonas are working together on maintenance of the network.
- Frequency channels used: 1, 6 and 11, 802.11g non-interfered channels
- Doodle Labs Wireless Routers were used.
- L-com antennas were used.

== See also ==
- Low-power wide-area network
- WiMAX
- LoRaWAN
- Fresnel zone
