= OpenWireless.org =

Internet activism project

The Open Wireless Movement hosted at OpenWireless.org is an Internet activism project which seeks to increase Internet access by encouraging people and organizations to configure or install software on their own wireless router to offer a separate public guest network or to make a single public wireless access point. If many people did this, then a ubiquitous global public wireless network would be created which would achieve and surpass the goal of increasing Internet access.

== History ==
The project was initiated in November 2012 by a coalition of ten advocacy groups including the Electronic Frontier Foundation (EFF), Fight for the Future, Free Press, Internet Archive, NYCwireless, Open Garden, OpenITP, the Open Spectrum Alliance, the Open Technology Institute, and the Personal Telco Project. EFF representative Adi Kamdar commented, "We envision a world where sharing one's Internet connection is the norm. A world of open wireless would encourage privacy, promote innovation, and largely benefit the public good. And everyone—users, businesses, developers, and Internet service providers—can get involved." As of September 2016, seventeen groups have joined the project, adding Engine, Mozilla, Noisebridge, the Open Rights Group, OpenMedia International, Sudo Room, and the Center for Media Justice.

The project uses various strategies to encourage and assist people to make their Internet connections available for public use. It explains the benefits and drawbacks of the effects on society and on the owners of routers, answers questions regarding safety and legality, guides novice users in configuring their routers, and provides firmware for novices to install on their routers.

== Router ==
The EFF created a router firmware called OpenWireless, a fork of CeroWRT, which is a branch of the OpenWrt firmware. which anyone may volunteer to install on their router to make it work for the OpenWireless.org project. This firmware was first shared at the 2014 Hackers on Planet Earth conference. Its developers set out to achieve simple installation on a wide range of hardware routers but struggled with the diversity of closed, proprietary devices, and development of the OpenWireless firmware ended in April 2015 and was merged into Linux kernel and OpenWRT, openwireless.org redirects to eff.org.

"In particular, once we obtained our first field data on router prevalence, we saw that none of the router models we expected to be able to support well have market shares above around 0.1%. Though we anticipated a fragmented market, that extreme degree of router diversity means that we would need to support dozens of different hardware platforms in order to be available to any significant number of users, and that does not seem to be an efficient path to pursue. Without a good path to direct deployment, EFF is deprioritizing our work on the freestanding router firmware project."

== See also ==
- Open-source hardware
- Legality of piggybacking
- Municipal wireless network
- Wireless community network
- Piggybacking (Internet access)
