= Fake AP =

A fake AP can refer to:

- A honeypot, which is a fake access point made to attract hackers and other wireless intruders in order to collect information about them
- A rogue access point physically installed on a (wired) network a hacker is attacking from the outside
