= Wallpaper (disambiguation) =

Wallpaper is material used to cover and decorate interior walls.

Wallpaper may also refer to:

- Wallpaper (musician), also known as Ricky Reed
- Wallpaper, a 2018 Canadian children's book by Thao Lam
- Wallpaper (computing), a background picture on computer screens
- Wallpaper (magazine) (since 1996), a cultural magazine
- Wallpaper group, a two-dimensional repeated pattern analysis
- Operation Wallpaper, a 1985 South African Defense Force military operation

== See also ==
- Stealth wallpaper, signal-shielding wallpaper to prevent electronic eavesdropping
- Wallpaper effect, a stereoscopic illusion in which wallpaper acts as an autostereogram
