= Adware =

Software with, often unwanted, adverts

Adware, often called advertising-supported software by its developers, is software that generates revenue by automatically displaying online advertisements in the user interface or on a screen presented during the installation process. In some cases, it can track online behavior to display personalized ads.

The software may generate two types of revenue: one is for the display of the advertisement and another on a "pay-per-click" basis, if the user clicks on the advertisement. Some advertisements also act as spyware, collecting and reporting data about the user, to be sold or used for targeted advertising or user profiling. The software may implement advertisements in a variety of ways, including a static box display, a banner display, a full screen, a video, a pop-up ad or in some other form. All forms of advertising carry health, ethical, privacy and security risks for users.

The 2003 Microsoft Encyclopedia of Security and some other sources use the term "adware" differently: "any software that installs itself on your system without your knowledge and displays advertisements when the user browses the Internet", i.e., a form of malware. Some developers offer software free of charge and rely on advertising revenue to recoup their expenses and generate income. Some offer a version without advertising, for a fee.

== Types of adware ==
In legitimate software, the advertising functions are integrated into or bundled with the program. Adware is usually seen by the developer as a way to recover development costs and generate revenue. In some cases, the developer may provide the software to the user free of charge or at a reduced price. The income derived from presenting advertisements to the user may allow or motivate the developer to continue to develop, maintain and upgrade the software product. The use of advertising-supported software in business is becoming increasingly popular, with a third of IT and business executives in a 2007 survey by McKinsey & Company planning to be using ad-funded software within the following two years. Advertisement-funded software is also one of the business models for open-source software.

=== Application software ===
Some software is offered in both an advertising-supported mode and a paid, advertisement-free mode. The latter is usually available after buying a license or registration code that unlocks the mode or a separate version of the software. (Note: For example, in 2007 Microsoft changed its productivity suite Microsoft Works to be advertising-supported. Works was subsequently replaced with the Microsoft Office 2010 software suite operating in a "starter" mode that included advertisements. As of 2012, this product is also being phased out and replaced with Office Online (formerly Office Web Apps).)

Some software authors offer advertising-supported versions of their software as an alternative option to business organizations seeking to avoid paying large sums for software licenses, funding the development of the software with higher fees for advertisers.

Examples of advertising-supported software include Adblock Plus ("Acceptable Ads"), the Windows version of the Internet telephony application Skype, and the Amazon Kindle 3 family of e-book readers, which has versions called "Kindle with Special Offers" that display advertisements on the home page and in sleep mode in exchange for substantially lower pricing.

In 2012, Microsoft and its advertising division, Microsoft Advertising, (Note: Formed in 2008 following Microsoft's acquisition of digital marketing company aQuantive.) announced that Windows 8, the major release of the Microsoft Windows operating system, would provide built-in methods for software authors to use advertising support as a business model. The idea had been considered since as early as 2005. Most editions of Windows 10 include adware by default.

=== Software as a service ===
Support by advertising is a popular business model of software as a service (SaaS) on the Web. Notable examples include the email service Gmail and other Google Workspace products (previously called Google Apps and G Suite), and the social network Facebook. Microsoft has also adopted the advertising-supported model for many of its social software SaaS offerings. The Microsoft Office Live service was also available in an advertising-supported mode.

== Definitions of spyware, consent and ethics ==
In the view of Federal Trade Commission staff, there appears to be general agreement that software should be considered "spyware" only if it is downloaded or installed on a computer without the user's knowledge and consent. Unresolved issues remain concerning how, what and when consumers need to be told about software installed on their computers. For instance, distributors often disclose in an end-user license agreement that there is additional software bundled with primary software, but some participants did not view such disclosure as sufficient to infer consent.

Much of the discussion on the topic involves the idea of informed consent, the assumption being that this standard eliminates any ethical issues with any given software's behavior. If a majority of important software, websites and devices were to adopt similar behavior and only the standard of informed consent is used, then logically a user's only recourse against that behavior would become not using a computer. The contract would become an ultimatum—agree or be ostracized from the modern world. This is a form of psychological coercion and presents an ethical problem with using implied or inferred consent as a standard. There are notable similarities between this situation and binding arbitration clauses which have become inevitable in contracts in the United States.

Furthermore, certain forms and strategies of advertising have been shown to lead to psychological harm, especially in children. One example is childhood eating disorders—several studies have reported a positive association between exposure to beauty and fashion magazines and an increased level of weight concerns or eating disorder symptoms in girls.

== Malware ==
The term adware is frequently used to describe a form of malware (malicious software) which presents unwanted advertisements to the user of a computer. The advertisements produced by adware are sometimes in the form of a pop-up, sometimes in an "unclosable window" and sometimes injected into web pages.

When the term is used in this way, the severity of its implication varies. While some sources rate adware only as an "irritant", others classify it as an "online threat" or even rate it as seriously as computer viruses and trojans. The precise definition of the term in this context also varies. (Note: A workshop held by the Federal Trade Commission in 2005 asked representatives of the computer, electronic advertising and anti-spyware product industries, as well as representatives of trade associations, government agencies, consumer and privacy advocacy groups to define adware and its relation to spyware; there was no clear consensus.) Adware that observes the computer user's activities without their consent and reports it to the software's author is called spyware. Adware may collect the personal information of the user, causing privacy concerns. Most adware operates legally and some adware manufacturers have even sued antivirus companies for blocking adware.

Programs have been developed to detect, quarantine and remove advertisement-displaying malware, including Ad-Aware, Malwarebytes' Anti-Malware, Spyware Doctor and Spybot – Search & Destroy. In addition, almost all commercial antivirus software currently detect adware and spyware, or offer a separate detection module.

A new wrinkle is adware that disables anti-malware and virus protection; technical remedies are available.

In September 2017 Lenovo agreed to settle charges brought by the Federal Trade Commission (FTC) and 32 state attorneys general over VisualDiscovery, a program developed by Superfish that was preinstalled on hundreds of thousands of Lenovo laptops. The FTC alleged that the software displayed pop-up ads on websites users visited, including encrypted ones. To do so it interfered with browser security protections. Under the settlement Lenovo must obtain consumers' affirmative consent before preinstalling such software.

Adware has also been discovered in certain low-cost Android devices, particularly those made by small Chinese firms running on Allwinner systems-on-chip. There are even cases where adware code is embedded deep into files stored on the system and boot partitions, to which removal involves extensive (and complex) modifications to the firmware.

In recent years, machine-learning based systems have been implemented to detect malicious adware on Android devices by examining features in the flow of network traffic.

== See also ==
- Malvertising
- Online advertising
- Typhoid adware
