= Wireless security =

Aspect of wireless networks

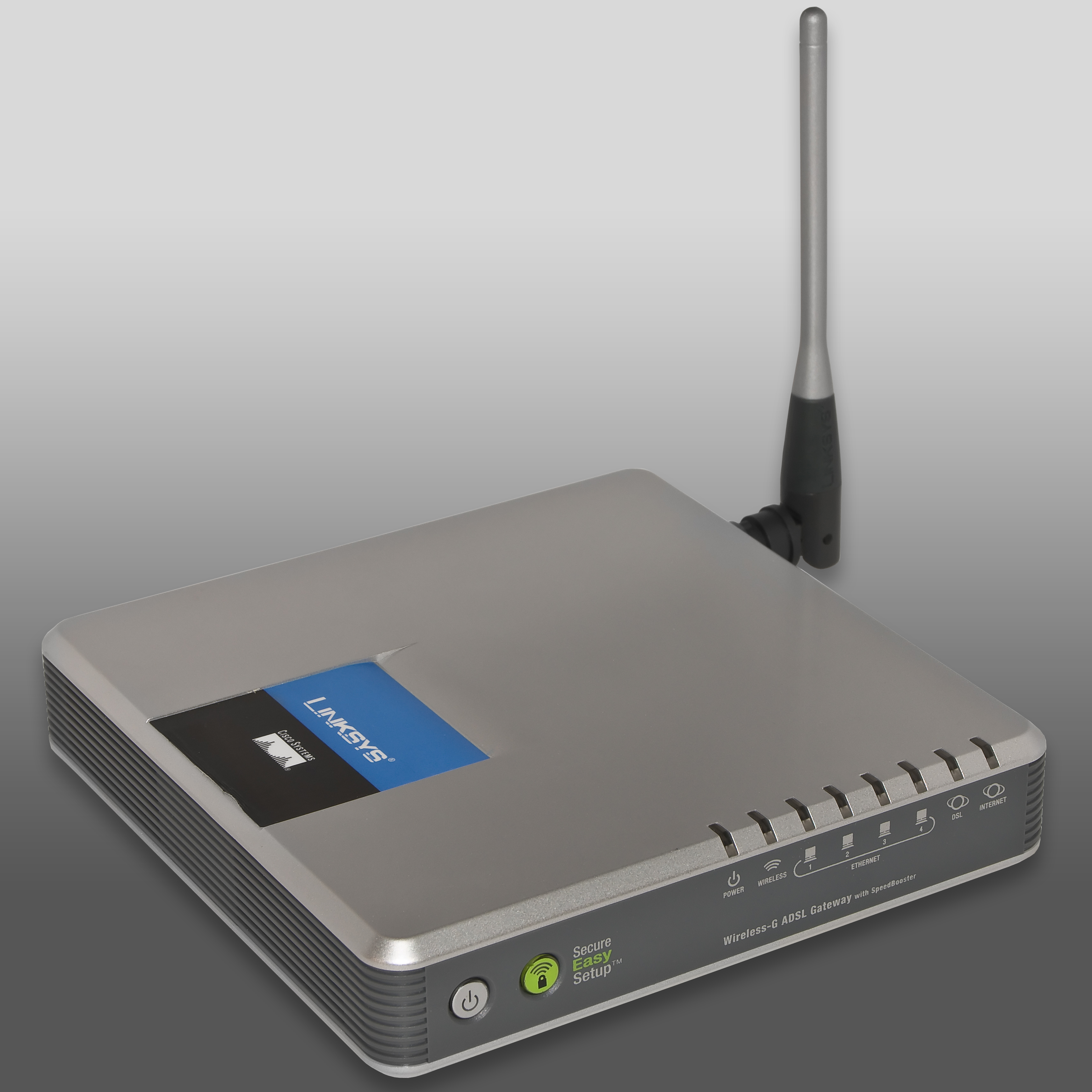
An example wireless router, that can implement wireless security features

Wireless security is the prevention of unauthorized access or damage to computers or data using Wireless networks, which include Wi-Fi networks. The term may also refer to protecting the wireless network itself from adversaries seeking to damage the confidentiality, integrity, or availability of the network. The most common type is Wi-Fi security, which includes Wired Equivalent Privacy (WEP) and Wi-Fi Protected Access (WPA). WEP is an old IEEE 802.11 standard from 1997. It is a notoriously weak security standard: the password it uses can often be cracked in a few minutes with a basic laptop computer and widely available software tools. WEP was superseded in 2003 by WPA, a quick alternative at the time to improve security over WEP. The current standard is WPA2; some hardware cannot support WPA2 without a firmware upgrade or replacement. WPA2 uses an encryption device that encrypts the network with a 256-bit key; the longer key length improves security over WEP. Enterprises often enforce security using a certificate-based system to authenticate the connecting device, following the standard 802.11X.

In January 2018, the Wi-Fi Alliance announced WPA3 as a replacement for WPA2. Certification began in June 2018, and WPA3 support has been mandatory for devices that bear the "Wi-Fi CERTIFIED™" logo since July 2020.

Many laptop computers have wireless cards pre-installed. The ability to enter a network while mobile has great benefits. However, wireless networking is prone to some security issues. Hackers have found wireless networks relatively easy to break into, and even use wireless technology to hack into wired networks. As a result, it is very important that enterprises define effective wireless security policies that guard against unauthorized access to important resources. Wireless Intrusion Prevention Systems (WIPS) or Wireless Intrusion Detection Systems (WIDS) are commonly used to enforce wireless security policies.

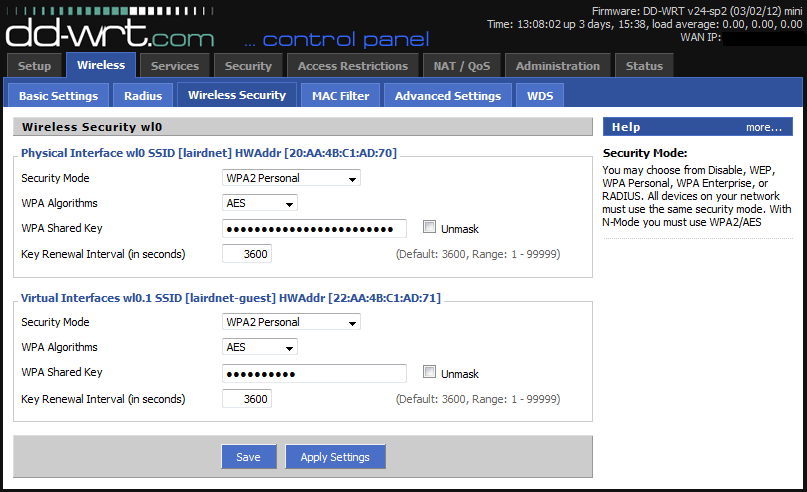
Security settings panel for a DD-WRT router

The risks to users of wireless technology have increased as the service has become more popular. There were relatively few dangers when wireless technology was first introduced. Hackers had not yet had time to latch on to the new technology, and wireless networks were not commonly found in the workplace. However, there are many security risks associated with the current wireless protocols and encryption methods, and in the carelessness and ignorance that exists at the user and corporate IT level. Hacking methods have become much more sophisticated and innovative with wireless access. Hacking has also become much easier and more accessible with easy-to-use Windows- or Linux-based tools being made available on the web at no charge.

Some organizations that have no wireless access points installed do not feel that they need to address wireless security concerns. In-Stat MDR and META Group have estimated that 95% of all corporate laptop computers that were planned to be purchased in 2005 were equipped with wireless cards. Issues can arise in a supposedly non-wireless organization when a wireless laptop is plugged into the corporate network. A hacker could sit out in the parking lot and gather information from it through laptops and/or other devices, or even break in through this wireless card–equipped laptop and gain access to the wired network.

== Background ==
Anyone within the geographical network range of an open, unencrypted wireless network can "sniff", or capture and record, the traffic, gain unauthorized access to internal network resources as well as to the internet, and then use the information and resources to perform disruptive or illegal acts. Such security breaches have become important concerns for both enterprise and home networks.

If router security is not activated or if the owner deactivates it for convenience, it creates a free hotspot. Since most 21st-century laptop PCs have wireless networking built in (see Intel "Centrino" technology), they do not need a third-party adapter such as a PCMCIA Card or USB dongle. Built-in wireless networking might be enabled by default, without the owner realizing it, thus broadcasting the laptop's accessibility to any computer nearby.

Modern operating systems such as Linux, macOS, or Microsoft Windows make it fairly easy to set up a PC as a wireless LAN "base station" using Internet Connection Sharing, thus allowing all the PCs in the home to access the Internet through the "base" PC. However, lack of knowledge among users about the security issues inherent in setting up such systems often may allow others nearby access to the connection. Such "piggybacking" is usually achieved without the wireless network operator's knowledge; it may even be without the knowledge of the intruding user if their computer automatically selects a nearby unsecured wireless network to use as an access point.

== The threat situation ==
Wireless security is another aspect of computer security. Organizations may be particularly vulnerable to security breaches caused by rogue access points.

If an employee adds a wireless interface to an unsecured port of a system, they may create a breach in network security that would allow access to confidential materials. Countermeasures like disabling open switchports during switch configuration and VLAN configuration to limit network access are available to protect the network and the information it contains, but such countermeasures must be applied uniformly to all network devices.

=== Machine-to-machine context ===
Wireless communication is useful in industrial machine to machine (M2M) communication. Such industrial applications often have specific security requirements. Evaluation of these vulnerabilities and the resulting vulnerability catalogs in an industrial context when considering WLAN, NFC and ZigBee are available.

== Modes of unauthorized access ==
The modes of unauthorised access to links, to functions and to data is as variable as the respective entities make use of program code. There does not exist a full scope model of such threat. To some extent the prevention relies on known modes and methods of attack and relevant methods for suppression of the applied methods. However, each new mode of operation will create new options of threatening. Hence prevention requires a steady drive for improvement. The described modes of attack are just a snapshot of typical methods and scenarios where to apply them.

=== Accidental association ===
Violation of the security perimeter of a corporate network can come from a number of different methods and intents. One of these methods is referred to as "accidental association". When a user turns on a computer and it latches onto a wireless access point from a neighboring company's overlapping network, the user may not even know that this has occurred. However, it is a security breach in that proprietary company information is exposed and now there could exist a link from one company to the other. This is especially true if the laptop is also hooked to a wired network.

Accidental association is a case of wireless vulnerability called as "mis-association". Mis-association can be accidental, deliberate (for example, done to bypass corporate firewall) or it can result from deliberate attempts on wireless clients to lure them into connecting to attacker's APs.

=== Malicious association ===
"Malicious associations" are when wireless devices can be actively made by attackers to connect to a company network through their laptop instead of a company access point (AP). These types of laptops are known as "soft APs" and are created when a cybercriminal runs some software that makes their wireless network card look like a legitimate access point. Once the thief has gained access, they can steal passwords, launch attacks on the wired network, or plant trojans. Since wireless networks operate at the Layer 2 level, Layer 3 protections such as network authentication and virtual private networks (VPNs) offer no barrier. Wireless 802.1X authentications do help with some protection but are still vulnerable to hacking. The idea behind this type of attack may not be to break into a VPN or other security measures. Most likely the criminal is just trying to take over the client at the Layer 2 level.

=== Ad hoc networks ===
Ad hoc networks can pose a security threat. Ad hoc networks are defined as peer-to-peer networks between wireless computers that do not have an access point between them. While these networks usually offer little protection, encryption methods can provide security.

The security hole provided by Ad hoc networking is not the Ad hoc network itself but the bridge it provides into other networks, usually in the corporate environment, and the unfortunate default settings in most versions of Microsoft Windows to have this feature turned on unless explicitly disabled. Thus the user may not even know they have an unsecured Ad hoc network in operation on their computer. If they are also using a wired or wireless infrastructure network at the same time, they are providing a bridge to the secured organizational network through the unsecured Ad hoc connection. Bridging is in two forms. A direct bridge requires the user to actually configure a bridge between the two connections and is thus unlikely to be initiated unless explicitly desired, and an indirect bridge uses shared resources on the user's computer. The indirect bridge may expose private data shared from the user's computer to LAN connections, such as shared folders or private Network Attached Storage, making no distinction between authenticated or private connections and unauthenticated Ad-Hoc networks. This presents no threats not already familiar to open/public or unsecured wifi access points, but firewall rules may be circumvented in the case of poorly configured operating systems or local settings.

=== Non-traditional networks ===
Non-traditional networks such as personal network Bluetooth devices are not safe from hacking and should be regarded as a security risk. Even barcode readers, handheld PDAs, and wireless printers and copiers should be secured. These non-traditional networks can be easily overlooked by IT personnel who have narrowly focused on laptops and access points.

=== Identity theft (MAC spoofing) ===
Identity theft (or MAC spoofing) occurs when a hacker can listen in on network traffic and identify the MAC address of a computer with network privileges. Most wireless systems allow some kind of MAC filtering to allow only authorized computers with specific MAC IDs to gain access and utilize the network. However, programs exist that have network "sniffing" capabilities. Combine these programs with other software that allow a computer to pretend it has any MAC address that the hacker desires, and the hacker can easily get around that hurdle.

MAC filtering is effective only for small residential (SOHO) networks, since it provides protection only when the wireless device is "off the air". Any 802.11 device "on the air" freely transmits its unencrypted MAC address in its 802.11 headers, and it requires no special equipment or software to detect it. Anyone with an 802.11 receiver (laptop and wireless adapter) and a freeware wireless packet analyzer can obtain the MAC address of any transmitting 802.11 device within range. In an organizational environment, where most wireless devices are "on the air" throughout the active working shift, MAC filtering provides only a false sense of security since it prevents only "casual" or unintended connections to the organizational infrastructure and does nothing to prevent a directed attack.

=== Man-in-the-middle attacks ===
A man-in-the-middle attacker entices computers to log into a computer that is set up as a soft AP (Access Point). Once this is done, the hacker connects to a real access point through another wireless card offering a steady flow of traffic through the transparent hacking computer to the real network. The hacker can then sniff the traffic. One type of man-in-the-middle attack relies on security faults in challenge and handshake protocols to execute a "de-authentication attack". This attack forces AP-connected computers to drop their connections and reconnect with the hacker's soft AP (disconnects the user from the modem so they have to connect again using their password which one can extract from the recording of the event). Man-in-the-middle attacks are enhanced by software such as LANjack and AirJack which automate multiple steps of the process, meaning what once required some skill can now be done by script kiddies. Hotspots are particularly vulnerable to any attack since there is little to no security on these networks.

=== Denial of service ===
A Denial-of-service attack (DoS) occurs when an attacker continually bombards a targeted AP (Access Point) or network with bogus requests, premature successful connection messages, failure messages, and/or other commands. These cause legitimate users to not be able to get on the network and may even cause the network to crash. These attacks rely on the abuse of protocols such as the Extensible Authentication Protocol (EAP).

The DoS attack in itself does little to expose organizational data to a malicious attacker, since the interruption of the network prevents the flow of data and actually indirectly protects data by preventing it from being transmitted. The usual reason for performing a DoS attack is to observe the recovery of the wireless network, during which all of the initial handshake codes are re-transmitted by all devices, providing an opportunity for the malicious attacker to record these codes and use various cracking tools to analyze security weaknesses and exploit them to gain unauthorized access to the system. This works best on weakly encrypted systems such as WEP, where there are a number of tools available which can launch a dictionary-style attack of "possibly accepted" security keys based on the "model" security key captured during the network recovery.

=== Network injection ===
In a network injection attack, a hacker can make use of access points that are exposed to non-filtered network traffic, specifically broadcasting network traffic such as Spanning Tree Protocol (802.1D), OSPF, RIP, and HSRP. The hacker injects bogus networking re-configuration commands that affect routers, switches, and intelligent hubs. A whole network can be brought down in this manner and require rebooting or even reprogramming of all intelligent networking devices.

=== Caffe Latte attack ===
The Caffe Latte attack is a way to obtain a WEP key that does not require a nearby access point for the target network. The Caffe Latte attack works by tricking a client with the WEP password stored to connect to a malicious access point with the same SSID as the target network. After the client connects, the client generates ARP requests, which the malicious access point uses to obtain keystream data. The malicious access point then repeatedly sends a deauthentication packet to the client, causing the client to disconnect, reconnect, and send additional ARP requests, which the malicious access point then uses to obtain additional keystream data. Once the malicious access point has collected a sufficient amount of keystream data. the WEP key can be cracked with a tool like [aircrack-ng].

The Caffe Latte attack was demonstrated against the Windows wireless stack, but other operating systems may also be vulnerable.

The attack was named the "Caffe Latte" attack by researcher Vivek Ramachandran because it could be used to obtain the WEP key from a remote traveler in less than the 6 minutes it takes to drink a cup of coffee.

== Wireless intrusion prevention concepts ==
There are three principal ways to secure a wireless network.

- For closed networks (like home users and organizations) the most common way is to configure access restrictions in the access points. Those restrictions may include encryption and checks on MAC address. Wireless Intrusion Prevention Systems can provide wireless LAN security in this network model.
- For commercial providers, hotspots, and large organizations, the preferred solution is often to have an open and unencrypted, but completely isolated wireless network. The users will at first have no access to the Internet nor to any local network resources. Commercial providers usually forward all web traffic to a captive portal which provides for payment and/or authorization. Another solution is to require the users to connect securely to a privileged network using VPN.
- Wireless networks are less secure than wired ones; in many offices intruders can easily visit and hook up their own computer to the wired network without problems, gaining access to the network, and it is also often possible for remote intruders to gain access to the network through backdoors like Back Orifice. One general solution may be end-to-end encryption, with independent authentication on all resources that should not be available to the public.

There is no ready-designed system to prevent fraudulent usage of wireless communication or to protect data and functions with wirelessly communicating computers and other entities. However, there is a system of qualifying the taken measures as a whole according to a common understanding of what shall be seen as state of the art. The system of qualifying is an international consensus as specified in ISO/IEC 15408.

=== A wireless intrusion prevention system ===
A Wireless Intrusion Prevention System (WIPS) is a concept for the most robust way to counteract wireless security risks. However such a WIPS does not exist as a ready-designed solution to implement as a software package. A WIPS is typically implemented as an overlay to an existing Wireless LAN infrastructure, although it may be deployed standalone to enforce no-wireless policies within an organization. WIPS is considered so important to wireless security that in July 2009, the Payment Card Industry Security Standards Council published wireless guidelines for PCI DSS recommending the use of WIPS to automate wireless scanning and protection for large organizations.

Several WIPS vendors were established in the early 2000s. AirDefense was founded in 2001 and later acquired by Motorola in 2008. Mojo Networks was founded in 2004 and later acquired by Arista Networks in 2018. With the rapid growth of Wireless LANs, WIPS became an important part of every organization's security posture.

== Security measures ==
There are a range of wireless security measures, of varying effectiveness and practicality.

=== SSID hiding ===
A simple but ineffective method to attempt to secure a wireless network is to hide the SSID (Service Set Identifier). This provides very little protection against anything but the most casual intrusion efforts.

=== MAC ID filtering ===
One of the simplest techniques is to only allow access from known, pre-approved MAC addresses. Most wireless access points contain some type of MAC ID filtering. However, an attacker can simply sniff the MAC address of an authorized client and spoof this address.

=== Static IP addressing ===
Typical wireless access points provide IP addresses to clients via DHCP. Requiring clients to set their own addresses makes it more difficult for a casual or unsophisticated intruder to log onto the network, but provides little protection against a sophisticated attacker.

=== 802.11 security ===
IEEE 802.1X is the IEEE Standard authentication mechanism for devices wishing to attach to a Wireless LAN.

==== Regular WEP ====
The Wired Equivalent Privacy (WEP) encryption standard was the original encryption standard for wireless, but since 2004 with the ratification WPA2 the IEEE has declared it "deprecated", and while often supported, it is seldom or never the default on modern equipment.

Concerns were raised about its security as early as 2001, dramatically demonstrated in 2005 by the FBI, yet in 2007 T.J. Maxx admitted a massive security breach due in part to a reliance on WEP and the Payment Card Industry took until 2008 to prohibit its use – and even then allowed existing use to continue until June 2010.

==== WPAv1 ====
The Wi-Fi Protected Access (WPA and WPA2) security protocols were later created to address the problems with WEP. If a weak password, such as a dictionary word or short character string is used, WPA and WPA2 can be cracked. Using a long enough random password (e.g. 14 random letters) or passphrase (e.g. 5 randomly chosen words) makes pre-shared key WPA virtually uncrackable. The second generation of the WPA security protocol (WPA2) is based on the final IEEE 802.11i amendment to the 802.11 standard and is eligible for FIPS 140-2 compliance. With all those encryption schemes, any client in the network that knows the keys can read all the traffic.

Wi-Fi Protected Access (WPA) is a software/firmware improvement over WEP. All regular WLAN equipment that worked with WEP are able to be simply upgraded and no new equipment needs to be bought. WPA is a trimmed-down version of the 802.11i security standard that was developed by the IEEE 802.11 to replace WEP. The TKIP encryption algorithm was developed for WPA to provide improvements to WEP that could be fielded as firmware upgrades to existing 802.11 devices. The WPA profile also provides optional support for the AES-CCMP algorithm that is the preferred algorithm in 802.11i and WPA2.

WPA Enterprise provides RADIUS based authentication using 802.1X. WPA Personal uses a pre-shared Shared Key (PSK) to establish the security using an 8 to 63 character passphrase. The PSK may also be entered as a 64-character hexadecimal string. Weak PSK passphrases can be broken using off-line dictionary attacks by capturing the messages in the four-way exchange when the client reconnects after being deauthenticated. Wireless suites such as aircrack-ng can crack a weak passphrase in less than a minute. Other WEP/WPA crackers are AirSnort and Auditor Security Collection. Still, WPA Personal is secure when used with ‘good’ passphrases or a full 64-character hexadecimal key.

There was information, however, that Erik Tews (the man who created the fragmentation attack against WEP) was going to reveal a way of breaking the WPA TKIP implementation at Tokyo's PacSec security conference in November 2008, cracking the encryption on a packet in 12 to 15 minutes. Still, the announcement of this 'crack' was somewhat overblown by the media, because as of August, 2009, the best attack on WPA (the Beck-Tews attack) is only partially successful in that it only works on short data packets, it cannot decipher the WPA key, and it requires very specific WPA implementations in order to work.

==== Additions to WPAv1 ====
In addition to WPAv1, TKIP, WIDS and EAP may be added alongside. Also, VPN networks (non-continuous secure network connections) may be set up under the 802.11-standard. VPN implementations include PPTP, L2TP, IPsec and SSH. However, this extra layer of security may also be cracked with tools such as Anger, Deceit and Ettercap for PPTP; and ike-scan, IKEProbe, ipsectrace, and IKEcrack for IPsec-connections.

===== TKIP =====
This stands for Temporal Key Integrity Protocol and the acronym is pronounced as tee-kip. This is part of the IEEE 802.11i standard. TKIP implements per-packet key mixing with a re-keying system and also provides a message integrity check. These avoid the problems of WEP.

===== EAP =====
The WPA, an improvement over the IEEE 802.1X standard already improved the authentication and authorization for access to wireless and wired LANs. In addition to this, extra measures such as the Extensible Authentication Protocol (EAP) have initiated an even greater amount of security. This as EAP uses a central authentication server. Unfortunately, during 2002 a Maryland professor discovered some shortcomings. Over the next few years these shortcomings were addressed with the use of TLS and other enhancements. This new version of EAP is now called Extended EAP and is available in several versions; these include: EAP-MD5, PEAPv0, PEAPv1, EAP-MSCHAPv2, LEAP, EAP-FAST, EAP-TLS, EAP-TTLS, MSCHAPv2, and EAP-SIM.

====== EAP-versions ======
EAP versions include LEAP, PEAP and other EAPs.

LEAP

This stands for the Lightweight Extensible Authentication Protocol. This protocol is based on 802.1X and helps minimize the original security flaws by using WEP and a sophisticated key management system. This EAP version is safer than EAP-MD5. This also uses MAC address authentication. LEAP is not secure; THC-LeapCracker can be used to break Cisco's version of LEAP and be used against computers connected to an access point in the form of a dictionary attack. Anwrap and asleap are other crackers capable of breaking LEAP.

PEAP

This stands for Protected Extensible Authentication Protocol. This protocol allows for a secure transport of data, passwords, and encryption keys without the need for a certificate server. This was developed by Cisco, Microsoft, and RSA Security.

Other EAPs There are other types of Extensible Authentication Protocol implementations that are based on the EAP framework. The framework that was established supports existing EAP types as well as future authentication methods. EAP-TLS offers very good protection because of its mutual authentication. Both the client and the network are authenticated using certificates and per-session WEP keys. EAP-FAST also offers good protection. EAP-TTLS is another alternative made by Certicom and Funk Software. It is more convenient as one does not need to distribute certificates to users, yet offers slightly less protection than EAP-TLS.

=== Restricted access networks ===
Solutions include a newer system for authentication, IEEE 802.1X, that promises to enhance security on both wired and wireless networks. Wireless access points that incorporate technologies like these often also have routers built in, thus becoming wireless gateways.

=== End-to-end encryption ===
One can argue that both layer 2 and layer 3 encryption methods are not good enough for protecting valuable data like passwords and personal emails. Those technologies add encryption only to parts of the communication path, still allowing people to spy on the traffic if they have gained access to the wired network somehow. The solution may be encryption and authorization in the application layer, using technologies like SSL, SSH, GnuPG, PGP and similar.

The disadvantage with the end-to-end method is that it may fail to cover all traffic. With encryption on the router level or VPN, a single switch encrypts all traffic, even UDP and DNS lookups. With end-to-end encryption, on the other hand, each service to be secured must have its encryption "turned on", and often every connection must also be "turned on" separately. For sending emails, every recipient must support the encryption method, and must exchange keys correctly. For the Web, not all websites offer HTTPS, and even if they do, the browser sends out IP addresses in clear text.

The most prized resource is often access to the Internet. An office LAN owner seeking to restrict such access will face the nontrivial enforcement task of having each user authenticate themselves for the router.

=== 802.11i security ===
The newest and most rigorous security to implement into WLANs today is the 802.11i RSN standard. This full-fledged 802.11i standard (which uses WPAv2) however does require the newest hardware (unlike WPAv1), thus potentially requiring the purchase of new equipment. This new hardware required may be either AES-WRAP (an early version of 802.11i) or the newer and better AES-CCMP equipment. One should make sure one needs WRAP or CCMP equipment, as the 2 hardware standards are not compatible.

==== WPAv2 ====
WPA2 is a WiFi Alliance-branded version of the final 802.11i standard. The primary enhancement over WPA is the inclusion of the AES-CCMP algorithm as a mandatory feature. Both WPA and WPA2 support EAP authentication methods using RADIUS servers and preshared key (PSK).

The number of WPA and WPA2 networks are increasing, while the number of WEP networks are decreasing, because of the security vulnerabilities in WEP.

WPA2 has been found to have at least one security vulnerability, nicknamed Hole196. The vulnerability uses the WPA2 Group Temporal Key (GTK), which is a shared key among all users of the same BSSID, to launch attacks on other users of the same BSSID. It is named after page 196 of the IEEE 802.11i specification, where the vulnerability is discussed. In order for this exploit to be performed, the GTK must be known by the attacker.

==== Additions to WPAv2 ====
Unlike 802.1X, 802.11i already has most other additional security services such as TKIP. Just as with WPAv1, WPAv2 may work in cooperation with EAP and a WIDS.

=== WAPI ===
This stands for WLAN Authentication and Privacy Infrastructure. This is a wireless security standard defined by the Chinese government.

=== Smart cards, USB tokens, and software tokens ===
Security token use is a method of authentication relying upon only authorized users possessing the requisite token. Smart cards are physical tokens in the cards that utilize an embedded integrated circuit chip for authentication, requiring a card reader. USB Tokens are physical tokens that connect via a USB port to authenticate the user.

=== RF shielding ===
It is practical in some cases to apply specialized wall paint and window film to a room or building to significantly attenuate wireless signals, which keeps the signals from propagating outside a facility. This can significantly improve wireless security because it is difficult for hackers to receive the signals beyond the controlled area of a facility, such as from a parking lot.

=== Denial of service defense ===
Most DoS attacks are easy to detect. However, many are difficult to stop even after detection. Here are three common ways to stop a DoS attack.

==== Blackholing ====
Blackholing is one possible way of stopping a DoS attack, achieved by dropping all IP packets from an attacker. Due to attackers having ability to change their source address at any moment, this method of defense becomes inefficient in long-term.

This may have negative effects if done automatically. An attacker could knowingly spoof attack packets with the IP address of a corporate partner. Automated defenses could block legitimate traffic from that partner and cause additional problems.

==== Validating the handshake ====
Validating the handshake involves creating false opens and not setting aside resources until the sender acknowledges. Some firewalls address SYN floods by pre-validating the TCP handshake. This is done by creating false opens. When a SYN segment arrives, the firewall sends back a SYN/ACK segment without passing the SYN segment on to the target server.

Only when the firewall gets back an ACK, which would happen only in a legitimate connection, would the firewall send the original SYN segment on to the server for which it was originally intended. The firewall does not set aside resources for a connection when a SYN segment arrives, so handling a large number of false SYN segments is only a small burden.

==== Rate limiting ====
Rate limiting can reduce a certain type of traffic to an amount that can be reasonably handled. Broadcasting to the internal network could still be used, but only at a limited rate for example. This is for more subtle DoS attacks. This works well if an attack targets a single server because it keeps transmission lines at least partially open for other communication.

Rate limiting frustrates both the attacker and the legitimate users. This helps but does not fully solve the problem. Once DoS traffic clogs the access line to the internet, there is nothing a border firewall can do to help. Most DoS attacks are problems of the community which can only be stopped with the help of ISP's and organizations whose computers are taken over as bots and used to attack other firms.

== Mobile devices ==
With an increasing number of mobile devices with 802.1X interfaces, security of such mobile devices becomes a concern. While open-source tools such as Kismet can monitor wireless networks and detect potential intrusions, access point solutions should extend towards covering mobile devices also. Host-based solutions for mobile handsets and PDA's with 802.1X interface.

Security within mobile devices falls under three categories:

1. Protecting against ad hoc networks
2. Connecting to rogue access points
3. Mutual authentication schemes such as WPA2 as described above

Wireless IPS solutions now offer wireless security for mobile devices.

Mobile patient monitoring devices are becoming an integral part of the healthcare industry and these devices will eventually become the method of choice for accessing and implementing health checks for patients located in remote areas. For these types of patient monitoring systems, security and reliability are critical because they can influence the condition of patients and could leave medical professionals in the dark about the condition of the patient if compromised.

== Implementing network encryption ==
In order to implement 802.11i, one must first make sure both that the router/access point(s), as well as all client devices are indeed equipped to support the network encryption. If this is done, a server such as RADIUS, ADS, NDS, or LDAP needs to be integrated. This server can be a computer on the local network, an access point/router with an integrated authentication server, or a remote server. AP's/routers with integrated authentication servers are often very expensive and are specifically an option for commercial usage like hot spots. Hosted 802.1X servers via the Internet require a monthly fee; running a private server is free yet has the disadvantage that one must set it up and that the server needs to be on continuously.

To set up a server, server and client software must be installed. Server software required is an enterprise authentication server such as RADIUS, ADS, NDS, or LDAP. The required software can be picked from various suppliers, such as Microsoft, Cisco, Funk Software, Meetinghouse Data, and from some open-source projects. Software includes:

- Aradial RADIUS Server
- Cisco Secure Access Control Software
- freeRADIUS (open-source)
- Funk Software Steel Belted RADIUS (Odyssey)
- Microsoft Internet Authentication Service
- Meetinghouse Data EAGIS
- SkyFriendz (free cloud solution based on freeRADIUS)

Client software comes built-in with Windows XP and may be integrated into other OS's using any of the following software:

- AEGIS-client
- Cisco ACU-client
- Intel PROSet/Wireless Software
- Odyssey client
- Xsupplicant (open1X)-project

=== RADIUS ===
Remote Authentication Dial In User Service (RADIUS) is an AAA (authentication, authorization and accounting) protocol used for remote network access. RADIUS, developed in 1991, was originally proprietary but then published in 1997 under ISOC documents RFC 2138 and RFC 2139. The idea is to have an inside server act as a gatekeeper by verifying identities through a username and password that is already pre-determined by the user. A RADIUS server can also be configured to enforce user policies and restrictions as well as record accounting information such as connection time for purposes such as billing.

== Open access points ==
Today, many urban areas have full wireless network coverage – the infrastructure for the wireless community networkis already in place. One could roam around and always be connected to the Internet if the nodes were open to the public, but due to security concerns, most access points use encryption and the users generally do not have access to disable the encryption. Many people consider it proper etiquette to leave access points open to the public, allowing free access to the Internet. Others think the default encryption provides substantial protection at a small inconvenience, against dangers of open access that they fear may be substantial even on a home DSL router.

The density of access points can even be a problem – there are a limited number of channels available, and they partly overlap. Each channel can handle multiple networks, but in places with many private wireless networks (for example, apartment complexes), the limited number of Wi-Fi radio channels might cause slowness and other problems.

According to the advocates of Open Access Points, it should not involve any significant risks to open up wireless networks for the public:

- The wireless network is after all confined to a small geographical area. A computer connected to the Internet and having improper configurations or other security problems can be exploited by anyone from anywhere in the world, while only clients in a small geographical range can exploit an open wireless access point. Thus the exposure is low with an open wireless access point, and the risks with having an open wireless network are small. However, one should be aware that an open wireless router will give access to the local network, often including access to file shares and printers.
- The only way to keep communication truly secure is to use end-to-end encryption. For example, when accessing an internet bank, one would almost always use strong encryption from the web browser and all the way to the bank – thus it should not be risky to do banking over an unencrypted wireless network. The argument that anyone can sniff the traffic applies to wired networks too, where system administrators and possible hackers have access to the links and can read the traffic. Also, anyone knowing the keys for an encrypted wireless network can gain access to the data being transferred over the network.
- If services like file shares, access to printers etc. are available on the local net, it is advisable to have authentication (i.e. by password) for accessing it (one should never assume that the private network is not accessible from the outside). Correctly set up, it should be safe to allow access to the local network to outsiders.
- With the most popular encryption algorithms today, a sniffer will usually be able to compute the network key in a few minutes.
- It is very common to pay a fixed monthly fee for the Internet connection, and not for the traffic – thus extra traffic will not be detrimental.
- Where Internet connections are plentiful and cheap, freeloaders will seldom be a prominent nuisance.

On the other hand, in some countries including Germany, persons providing an open access point may be made (partially) liable for any illegal activity conducted via this access point. Also, many contracts with ISPs specify that the connection may not be shared with other persons.

== See also ==
- Aircrack-ng
- Electromagnetic shielding
- Kismet
- KRACK
- List of router firmware projects
- Network encryption cracking
- Mobile security
- Payment Card Industry Data Security Standard
- Stealth wallpaper
- Tempest (codename)
- Wireless intrusion prevention system
- Wireless Public Key Infrastructure (WPKI)
- Exploits of wireless networks
