= WokFi =

Homemade Wi-Fi antenna

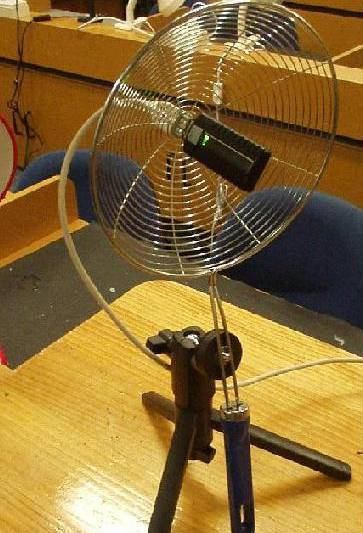
Mid-sized WokFi antenna sample

WokFi (a portmanteau derived from blending the words Wok + Wi-Fi) is a slang term for a style of homemade Wi-Fi antenna consisting of a crude parabolic antenna made with a low-cost Asian kitchen wok, spider skimmer or similar household metallic dish. The dish forms a directional antenna which is pointed at the wireless access point antenna, allowing reception of the wireless signal at greater distances than standard omnidirectional Wi-Fi antennas.

== Description ==
WokFi antennas are fabricated out of commonly available concave metal kitchen dishes or dish covers (which need not be perfectly parabolic); Asian woks are favored because they have shapes closest to parabolic. A commercial Wi-Fi antenna, usually a USB Wi-Fi dongle, is suspended in front of the dish, attached by cable to the computer.

The WokFi antenna is among many cheap and simple antenna projects, such as the popular cantenna. It is among the methods to boost the Wi-Fi connection quality, audit access point coverage, and establish WLAN viability.

== Advantages ==
A significant advantage is that with a USB modem the RF signal is converted to a conventional digital signal at the antenna. Therefore, by using standard USB extension cables, the antenna can be located at a distance from the computer of five meters or more, with no concerns over microwave signal losses that would occur in an RF coaxial cable feedline of that length used to attach a conventional antenna to the RF input of a computer modem. Chaining active USB repeaters, it is possible to locate the antenna at much greater distances from the computer, which is especially useful when line-of-sight (LOS) obstacles (such as vegetation and walls) require the antenna to be located on a roof, for example. If using mesh reflectors, usually with a grid under 5 mm, the antenna will be lighter and present a smaller wind-load than larger dishes.

== Performance ==
WokFi gains are typically 10+ dB, with range boosts, thus can be 16-32 times over the antenna of a bare USB adapter. Ranges (LoS) are typically 3–5 km (1.9–3.1 mi), although an aligned pair of similar point-to-point transceiver setups may approach 10 km (6.2 mi) over a clear path. In addition, certain improved WokFi antennas, and antennas made using 60 to 90 cm (2.0 to 3.0 ft) diameter round or oval satellite TV dishes, allow even far greater range, up to 20 km (12 mi).

Interference from nearby 2.4 GHz signals (perhaps from cordless phones, AV links, leaky microwave ovens, other APs or Bluetooth) can be nulled out—a useful feature in this increasingly crowded part of the RF spectrum. The performance of abundant, low-powered Wi-Fi "dongles", typically selling for approximately US$15–20, but of only 30–40 mW transmitter power and modest receiver sensitivity, can easily be boosted with little more than cheap cookware or pot lids. The "sweet spot" on such ad hoc reflectors can readily be found by taping a small (~2.5 cm, or 1 in) mirror on the surface of the dish, to see where the sun's rays focus.

== See also ==
- Bricolage – Creation of an artwork from a diverse range of things that happen to be available
- Cantenna – Antenna built with a metal can
- Chindōgu – Gadgets creating more problems than they solve
- Improvisation – Process of devising a solution to a requirement in an ad hoc fashion
- Jugaad – South Asian term describing a creative hack or kludge
- Jury rigging – Term for a makeshift repair
- Life hack – Trick to make life easier
