= Stealth wallpaper =

For computer network security, stealth wallpaper is a material designed to prevent an indoor Wi-Fi network from extending or "leaking" outside a building, where malicious persons may attempt to eavesdrop or attack the network. While it is simple to prevent all electronic signals from passing through a building by covering the interior with metal, stealth wallpaper accomplishes the more difficult task of blocking Wi-Fi signals while still allowing cellphone signals to pass through.

The first stealth wallpaper was originally designed by UK defense contractor BAE Systems In 2012, The Register reported that a commercial wallpaper had been developed by Grenoble Institute of Technology and the Centre Technique du Papier with planned sale in 2013. This wallpaper blocks three selected Wi-Fi frequencies. Nevertheless, it does allow GSM and 4G signals to pass through the network, therefore allowing cell phone use to remain unaffected by the wallpaper.

== See also ==
- Electromagnetic shielding
- Faraday cage
- TEMPEST
- Wallpaper
- Wireless security
