= Cantenna =

Antenna built with a metal can

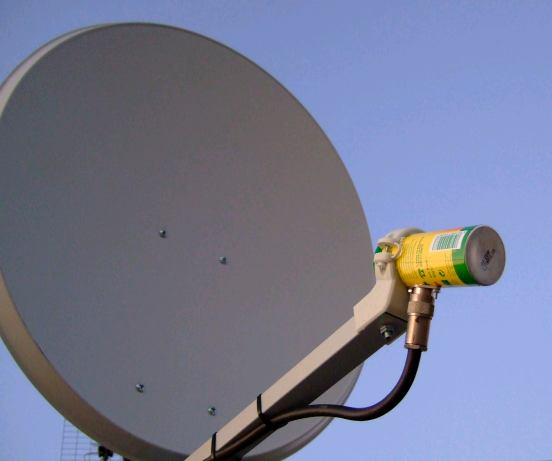
5.5 GHz cantenna as a feed horn

A cantenna (a portmanteau blending the words can and antenna) is a homemade directional waveguide antenna, made out of an open-ended metal can.

Cantennas are typically used to increase the range (or discovery) of Wi-Fi networks.

== Construction ==
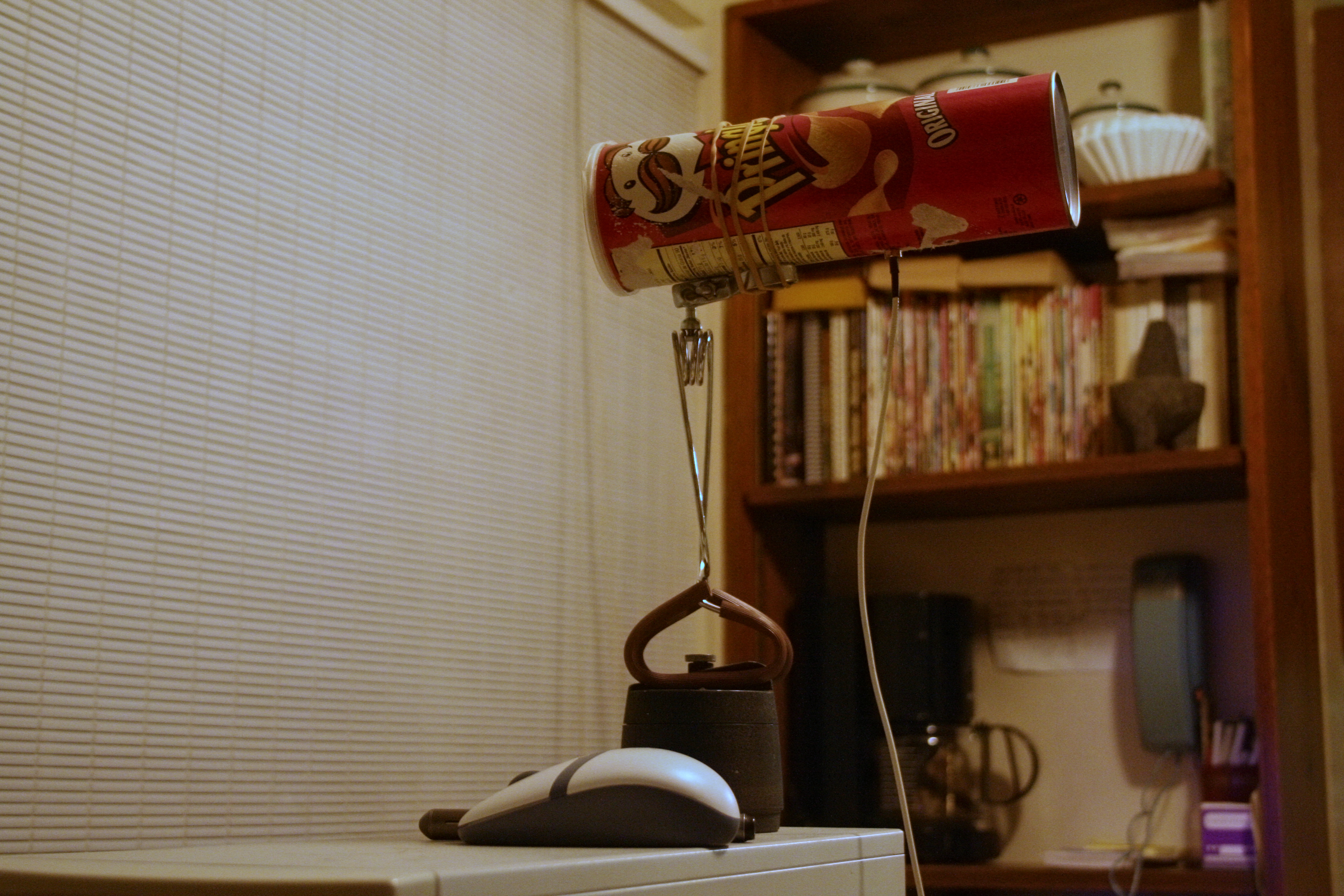
A Pringles cantenna for Wi-Fi

The cylinder portion of the can may consist of metal-coated paperboard.

Although some designs are based on a Pringles potato chips can, this tube is too narrow to increase the 2.4 GHz signal by a useful amount, although at 5 GHz it would be about the right size. However, a cantenna can be made from various cans or tubes of an appropriate diameter. Some designs include a pole mount to elevate the cantenna.

At 2.4 GHz, losses can occur if the cable from the cantenna to the Wi-Fi circuitry is too long. A more efficient cantenna can be made by minimising this length or connecting the cantenna directly to the Wi-Fi circuitry.

== Use ==
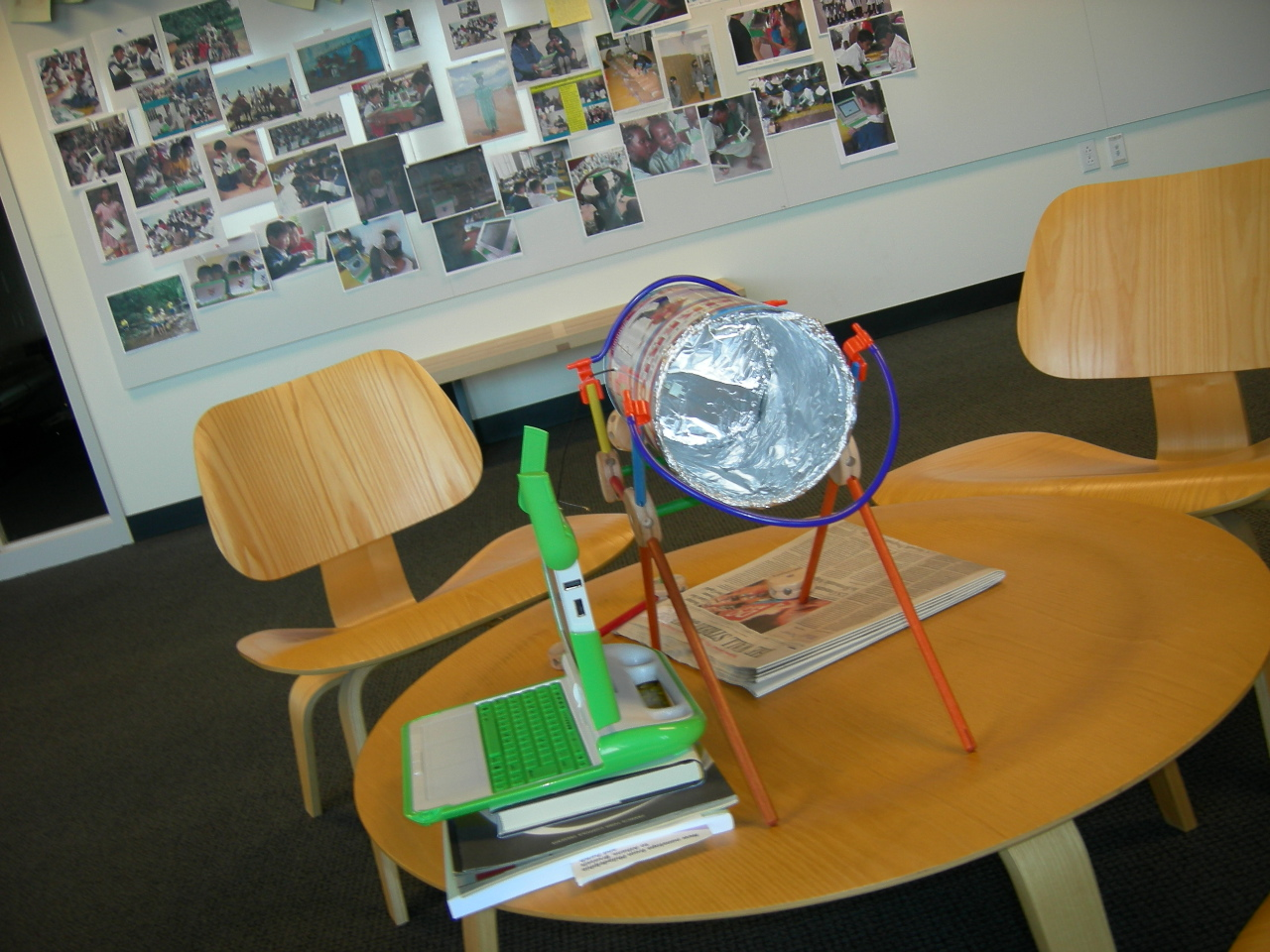
A cantenna on an OLPC laptop

Cantennas are typically used for extending a wireless local area network (WLAN).

The tiny design makes them ideal for mobile applications such as wardriving.

Cantennas can be used to increase cell phone range, improve reception, and decrease noise.

A cantenna can be used as a satellite dish feed horn. The 5.5 GHz cantenna dimensions are almost perfect in that they make a good fit for the standard TV satellite dish. The resulting setup is a low-cost high-quality high-gain antenna. Such setups are widely used in wireless community networks for long-distance Wi-Fi links.

Cantennas may be used with other RF devices such as wireless security cameras.

== See also ==
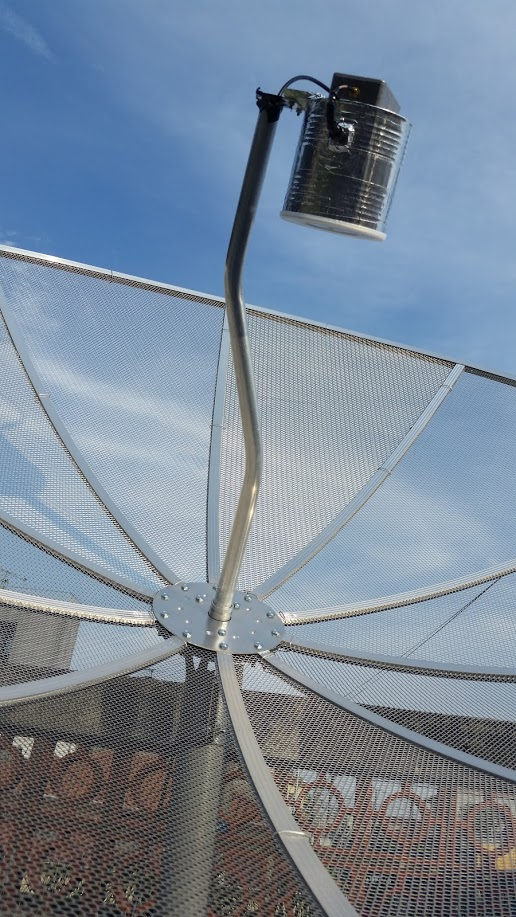
a Cantenna

- Chindōgu – Gadgets creating more problems than they solve
- Jury rigging – Term for a makeshift repair
- WarXing – Search for wireless networks with mobile computing equipment
- WokFi – Homemade Wi-Fi antenna
