= Comparison of router software projects =

Router software requires updating to stay secure, this comparison provides an overview of third party options.

== Embedded ==
=== General ===
Project	Parent project	Software license	Latest release	Alexa rank	About
OpenWrt	Linux / Linksys	GPL, etc.	2026-10-18	17,042	
Commotion Wireless	OpenWrt		2014-10-13	422,643	Abandoned
DD-WRT	Sveasoft Alchemy		2019-11-09	27,104	
LEDE	OpenWrt	GPL, etc.	—N/a	72,901	Merged with OpenWrt
RutOS	OpenWrt	GPL, etc.	2025-03-25	499,954	Operating System for Teltonika networking products
LibreCMC	OpenWrt		2024-12-26	2,099,9734	
Roofnet	OpenWrt	—N/a	—N/a	—N/a	Abandoned
DebWRT	OpenWrt / Debian		2017-01-02	3,585,093	Discontinued
HyperWRT	Linksys	GPL	2005-02-07	—N/a	Abandoned
Tomato	HyperWRT		2025-02-27	360,330	
Oleg	ASUSTeK	GPL	2008-03-30	—N/a	http://oleg.wl500g.info/

=== Features ===
Project	QoS	Guest AP	VPN client	VPN server	tor	adblock by domain/ip	Mesh	Package manager
OpenWrt	Yes	Yes	Yes	Yes	Yes	Yes	Yes	Opkg (3500)
DebWRT								Dpkg (23168?)
FreshTomato	Yes	Yes	Yes	Yes	Yes	Yes		-

=== Devices ===
Project	Total	x86	ARM	MIPS
OpenWrt	1875+	Yes	Yes	Yes
DD-WRT	many	Yes	Yes	
libreCMC	11			

== Other ==
Project	Parent project	Software license	Latest release	Alexa rank	About
IPFire	Linux	GPLv3+	2025-09-19	N/A	
Zeroshell	Linux		2021-01-16	466,964	Abandoned
m0n0wall	FreeBSD		2014-01-15	439,509	Abandoned
OPNsense	FreeBSD	Simplified BSD / FreeBSD License	2025-03-11	152,329	
pfsense	FreeBSD 14.0 CURRENT	ALv2	2023-12-07	26,342	

== See also ==
- Debian
- FreeBSD
- Kali Linux
- Linux kernel
- List of free and open-source software packages
- List of router and firewall distributions
- List of router firmware projects
- OpenBSD
- NetBSD
- Software
- Tails
