= List of router firmware projects =

List of software created and maintained by people other than the manufacturer of the product. The extent of support for (and testing on) particular hardware varies from project to project.

== Embedded ==
Notable custom firmware projects for wireless routers. Many of these will run on various brands such as Linksys, Asus, Netgear, etc.

- OpenWrt – Customizable free and open-source software (FOSS) firmware written from scratch; features a combined SquashFS/JFFS2 file system and the package manager opkg with over 3000 available packages (Linux/GPL); now merged with LEDE.
  - LEDE – A fork of the OpenWrt project that shared many of the same goals; merged back into OpenWrt with version 18.06 in 2018.
  - Commotion Wireless – FOSS mesh networking.
  - DD-WRT – Based on OpenWrt kernel since version 23 in December 2005, paid and free versions available.
  - Gargoyle – A free OpenWrt-based Linux distribution for a range of Broadcom and Atheros chipset based wireless routers.
  - LibreCMC – A Free Software Foundation-endorsed derivation of OpenWRT with the proprietary blobs removed
  - Roofnet – A now defunct experimental IEEE 802.11 based mesh network project developed at the MIT Computer Science and Artificial Intelligence Laboratory. The technology developed by the Roofnet project formed the basis for the company Meraki, now owned by Cisco.
  - DebWRT – A discontinued project that combines the Linux kernel from OpenWrt and the package management system from Debian (Linux/GPL).
  - OpenMPTCProuter – An OpenWrt-based FOSS firmware that uses Multipath TCP (MPTCP) to aggregate multiple internet connections for increased bandwidth, redundancy, and reliability.
- HyperWRT – Early power-boosting firmware project to stay close to the official Linksys WRT54G and WRT54GS firmware but add features such as transmit power, port triggers, scripts, telnet, etc.
  - Tomato – The successor to HyperWRT, features advanced QoS as well as Ajax and SVG graphs.
    - Asuswrt
      - Asuswrt-Merlin

== Other ==
Software distributions for routers with >5 GB Storage and >1 GB RAM

=== FreeBSD ===
- m0n0wall – An abandoned project built on FreeBSD and boots off of flash storage or CD-ROM media in under 12 megabytes.
  - pfsense – A fork of m0n0wall.
    - OPNsense – A fork of pfSense.

=== Linux ===
- Zeroshell – Defunct as of September 2021. Previously routers and bridges with VPN, QoS, load balancing and other functions
- IPFire – Advanced firmware written from scratch with customizable firewall and optional packages in the form of add ons.
- TNSR – Router software from Netgate (originally based on CentOS Linux, however recent versions are based on Ubuntu Linux) that incorporates Vector Packet Processing, Data Plane Development Kit, FRRouting, and Clixon technologies.
- VyOS – Open source network operating system based on Debian Linux.

== See also ==
- Comparison of router software projects
- Debian
- FreeBSD
- Kali Linux
- Linux kernel
- List of router and firewall distributions
- OpenBSD
- Outline of software
- Outline of free software
- NetBSD
- Tails
