= Julius Knapp =

Julius P. Knapp II is the chief of the Federal Communications Commission's (FCC) Office of Engineering Technology (OET). OET is the Commission's primary resource for engineering expertise and provides technical support to the Chairman, Commissioners and FCC Bureaus and Offices.

Mr. Knapp was named Chief of OET in October 2006, succeeding Ed Thomas who left the previous year, although he was the acting chief for some time before that. He became the Deputy Chief of OET in May 2001. Prior to that he was the Chief of the Policy & Rules Division where he was responsible for FCC frequency allocation proceedings and for proceedings amending the FCC rules for radio frequency devices. Mr. Knapp was Chief of the FCC Laboratory from 1994 to 1997 where he was responsible for the FCC's equipment authorization program and technical analyses.

Mr. Knapp received a bachelor's degree in electrical engineering from the City College of New York in 1974. He is a member of the IEEE EMC Society and is a Fellow of the Radio Club of America. He was the 2001 recipient of the Eugene C. Bowler award for exceptional professionalism and dedication to public service and received the FCC's Silver and Gold medal awards for distinguished service at the Commission.

In 2016, Knapp was involved in implementing new FCC rules that require Wifi router manufacturers to prevent modifications to the router's RF parameters.

On Nov. 27, 2019 the FCC announced Julius Knapp's planned retirement after 13 years as Chief of OET and more than 40 years at the Commission, effective Jan. 3, 2020. He stated, "My wonderful wife Debi and I plan to spend more time with our family and enjoy our `golden years.' "
