= Neighbornode =

Neighbornode is a captive portal on a residential Wi-Fi hotspot, containing a message board. It is designed to help neighbors who share an internet connection know each other better.

The message board can only be accessed within range of the hotspot. Individual Neighbornodes can be linked together to create a supernode, vaguely like Fidonet. It is implemented as an alternative firmware for the Linksys WRT54G router.

The project was created by John Geraci of Interactive Telecommunications Program, who also created Grafedia.
