= Linksys WRTP54G router =

Linksys WRTP54G is a Wi-Fi capable router with VoIP capability from Linksys. Launched in 2005, it is similar in function to the popular WRT54G, the device is capable of sharing Internet connections amongst several computers via 802.3 Ethernet and 802.11b/g wireless data links, but it also has two POTS ports for VoIP telephony.

== VoIP service providers ==
The router was being sold pre-configured for providers Vonage and EarthLink, but was also available without any pre-configured service. In the latter case one needed to configure the VoIP settings oneself. It sold for about $130 on launch, with a Vonage monthly plan of 500 VoIP hours priced at $15, after a $45 service charge. A PC World staff blog post in 2005 warned the reader not to be misled to think that the initial, and the only advertised price, was the total cost of ownership.

== Phreaking potential ==
An Associated Press story from August 2006 reported that "Arias Hung, a security professional with Media Access Guard in Seattle", showed how to change the MAC address of a device registered for Vonage service that "could intercept calls made to a legitimate Vonage user and make calls that would appear to come from the user's phone number," recommending that "The general consumer should stay away from this router."

== Internals ==
In a departure from most of the WRT54G series (which featured mostly Broadcom chipsets) this router features a Texas Instruments chipset. Texas Instruments chips are common to almost all current Linksys VOIP products.

The screws to open the unit are under the rubber pads. These units are often locked with a particular VoIP vendor's information. A Freeware program "cyt46.exe" can help.
