= Tinc (protocol) =

Open source mesh networking protocol

tinc
- Original authors: Guus Sliepen, Ivo Timmermans, Wessel Dankers
- Developer: The Tinc development team
- Release: 14 November 1998
- Stable release: 1.0.37 / 1 March 2026; 6 months ago
- Preview release: 1.1pre18 / 27 June 2021; 5 years ago
- Written in: C
- Platform: Linux, FreeBSD, OpenBSD, NetBSD, DragonFly BSD, Mac OS X, Microsoft Windows, Solaris, iOS, Android
- Type: VPN
- License: GPL
- Website: www.tinc-vpn.org
- Repository: tinc-vpn.org/git/tinc

Tinc is an open-source, self-routing, mesh networking protocol and software implementation used for compressed and encrypted virtual private networks. It was started in 1998 by Guus Sliepen, Ivo Timmermans, and Wessel Dankers, and released as a GPL-licensed project.

== Platforms ==
Tinc is available on Linux, FreeBSD, OpenBSD, NetBSD, DragonFly BSD, Mac OS X, Microsoft Windows, Solaris, iOS (jailbroken only), Android with full support for IPv6.

== Future goals ==
The authors of Tinc have goals of providing a platform that is secure, stable, reliable, scalable, easily configurable, and flexible.

== Embedded technologies ==
Tinc uses OpenSSL or LibreSSL as the encryption library and gives the options of compressing communications with zlib for "best compression" or LZO for "fast compression".

== Projects that use tinc ==
- Freifunk has tinc enabled in their routers as of October 2006.
- OpenWrt has an installable package for tinc.
- OPNsense, an open source router and firewall distribution, has a plugin for Tinc
- pfSense has an installable package in the 2.3 release.
- Tomato variants Shibby and FreshTomato include Tinc support.
- NYC Mesh uses tinc to connect parts of the mesh over the public internet that would be otherwise out of range.

== See also ==
- stunnel, encrypts any TCP connection (single port service) over SSL
- OpenVPN, an open source SSL VPN solution
- VTUN, an open source SSL VPN solution that can bridge Ethernet
