= HyperWRT =

Defunct firmware for routers

- OS family: Linux
- Working state: Discontinued
- Source model: Open source
- Initial release: 2004; 22 years ago
- Final release: 2.1b1 / February 20, 2005; 21 years ago
- License: GPL
- Succeeded by: Tomato
- Official website: sf.net/projects/hyperwrt/

HyperWRT is a defunct firmware project for the Linksys WRT54G and WRT54GS wireless routers based on the stock Linksys firmware, released under a GPL. The original goal of the HyperWRT project was to add a set of features—such as power boost—to the latest Linux-based Linksys firmware, extending its possibilities but staying close to the official firmware. Over time, it continued to be updated with newer Linksys firmware, and added many more features typically found in enterprise routing equipment. HyperWRT is no longer maintained, and has been succeeded by Tomato.

== History ==
The original HyperWRT project was started in 2004 by Timothy Jans, with continued development into early 2005. programmer Rupan then continued HyperWRT development by integrating newer Linksys code as it was released.

Later in 2005, developers called Tofu and Thibor picked up HyperWRT development with HyperWRT +tofu for the WRT54G and HyperWRT Thibor for the WRT54GS. Both developers collaborated frequently and added features from each other's releases, and both developed WRTSL54GS versions of their firmware. After February 2006, Tofu discontinued development and his code was incorporated into HyperWRT Thibor. HyperWRT Thibor15c (July 2006) was the last version of HyperWRT and was compatible with the WRT54G (v1-v4), WRT54GL (v1-v1.1), WRT54GS (v1-v4), and WRTSL54GS (later unfinished beta 17rc3 released February 2008).

== See also ==
- List of wireless router firmware projects
