= Grafedia =

Graffiti linking to virtual content

Grafedia is a type of graffiti, where hyperlinked text is written by hand onto physical surfaces and linking to rich media content including images, video, and sound files. Grafedia can be written in letters or postcards, on the body as tattoos, or on the street. Grafedia written on public buildings and structures is likely to be illegal and considered vandalism. Viewers 'click' on these Grafedia hyperlinks with their mobile phones by sending a message addressed to the word + "@grafedia.net" to get the content behind the link.

The project was created in 2005 by John Geraci, who also created Neighbornode.
