= Common Firmware Environment =

Common Firmware Environment (CFE), sometimes pronounced as 'cafe', is a firmware interface and bootloader developed by Broadcom for 32-bit and 64-bit system-on-a-chip systems. It is intended to be a flexible toolkit of CPU initialization and bootstrap code for use on embedded processors (typically running on MIPS32/64 instruction set CPUs found in Broadcom SoCs). It is roughly analogous to the BIOS on the IBM PC platform. Its source code is available as open source from Broadcom. Common embedded system alternatives include Das U-Boot.

Its main responsibility is to initialize CPUs, caches, memory controllers, and peripherals required early on in the power on stage. It typically incorporates several built-in device drivers for SoC peripherals, it has several console choices, including serial ports, ROM emulators, JTAG, etc. Just like in other boot loaders environment, variables are commonly configured in persistent storage to create auto boot options. It also has support for network bootstrap.

== Platforms ==
CFE is used in at least some of the following wireless router platforms:

- Apple Airport
- Asus routers
- Buffalo AirStation
- Linksys WRT54G series
- Netgear

CFE is used in the following home entertainment platforms:

- LG Smart TV
- LG Smart Blu-ray Players
- Samsung Smart TV
- Samsung Blu-ray Players

CFE is also used in the Amiga NG platform AmigaOne X1000

== See also ==
- Comparison of boot loaders
- Das U-Boot
