= Gargoyle (router firmware) =

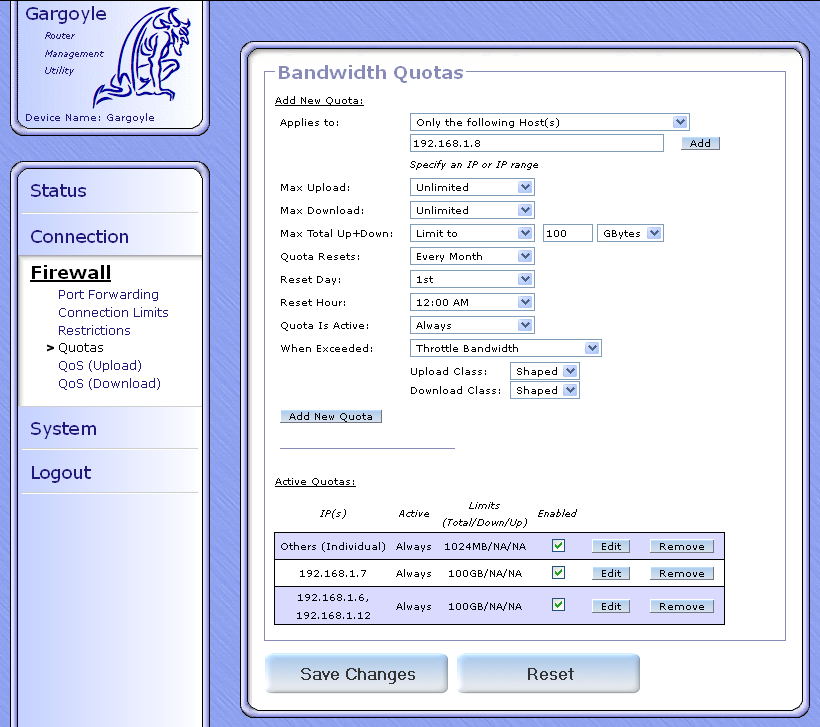
- Quotas configuration screen
- Developer: Eric Bishop
- OS family: Linux (Unix-like)
- Working state: Current
- Source model: Open source
- Initial release: 14 July 2008
- Latest release: 1.14.0 (May 31, 2023)
- Repository: github.com/ericpaulbishop/gargoyle
- Available in: English, Arabic (minimal support), Czech, French, German, Norwegian, Polish, Portuguese, Russian, Chinese (Simplified), Slovak, Spanish
- Update method: gpkg
- Package manager: gpkg
- Supported platforms: ar71xx, bcm27xx, bcm47xx, ipq40xx, ipq806x, mediatek, ~~mvebu~~, ramips, rockchip, x86/x64; potentially compatible with more as OpenWrt but requires 8 MB of Flash and 32 MB of RAM
- Kernel type: Monolithic (Linux)
- Userland: GNU
- Default user interface: CLI, WebUI
- License: Free software licenses (mainly GPL), and other licenses
- Official website: www.gargoyle-router.com

Gargoyle is a free OpenWrt-based Linux distribution for a range of wireless routers based on Broadcom, Atheros, MediaTek and others chipsets, Asus Routers, Netgear, Linksys and TP-Link routers. Among notable features is the ability to limit and monitor bandwidth and set bandwidth caps per specific IP address.

== Main features ==
- Network file storage sharing, SMB, CIFS.
- VPN server and VPN client (OpenVPN and WireGuard).
- Tor server and Tor client.
- Advertisement blocking.
- Wifi scheduled on/off.
- Bandwidth monitoring
- Quotas, limits and bandwidth throttling
- Quality of service (QoS) with active congestion control
- Website blacklisting by hostname or IP address

== Version history ==
Version	Release date	Type of Release	OpenWrt Base	Number of Incremental Releases
1.0	Jul 14, 2009	Stable	Kamikaze	16
1.1	Oct 25, 2009	Experimental	Kamikaze	8
1.2	Mar 21, 2010	Stable	Kamikaze	5
1.3	Jun 10, 2010	Experimental	Backfire	16
1.4	Aug 14, 2011	Stable	Backfire	7
1.5	Oct 25, 2011	Experimental	Backfire (Attitude Adjustment 1.5.7+)	11
1.6	Jan 15, 2014	Stable	Attitude Adjustment	2
1.7	Jan 05, 2015	Experimental	Barrier Breaker	2
1.8	Aug 20, 2015	Stable	Barrier Breaker	1
1.9	Nov 08, 2015	Experimental	Chaos Calmer	2
1.10	Oct 27, 2017	Stable	Chaos Calmer	0
1.11	Feb 02, 2019	Experimental	18.06 (18.06.2)	0
1.12	Dec 03, 2019	Stable	18.06 (18.06.5)	0
1.13	Feb 16, 2022	Experimental	19.07 (19.07.8)	0
1.14	May 31, 2023	Stable	22.03 (22.03.5)	0 (Current)

== See also ==
- List of wireless router firmware projects
