= Tunnelblick =

OpenVPN graphical user interface for macOS

- Developer: The Tunnelblick Project
- Written in: Objective-C
- Working state: Current
- Source model: Open-source
- Initial release: March 2010; 16 years ago
- Latest release: 8.0.3 / July 5, 2026; 49 days ago
- Repository: github.com/Tunnelblick/Tunnelblick
- Supported platforms: macOS
- License: GNU GPLv2
- Official website: tunnelblick.net

Tunnelblick is a free and open-source OpenVPN graphic user interface for macOS. It allows users to manage and configure the VPN connections used by installed OpenVPN clients and remove servers.

== History ==
The first stable release was version 3.0 in March 2010.

== Issues ==
In January 2016, the Sparkle Updater component used by Tunnelblick was found to be vulnerable to a man-in-the-middle attack. This security flaw has since been patched.

Any VPN or third-party tool like Tunnelblick can cause connectivity problems while syncing with iCloud.
