= DD-WRT =

Linux-based firmware for wireless routers and wireless access points

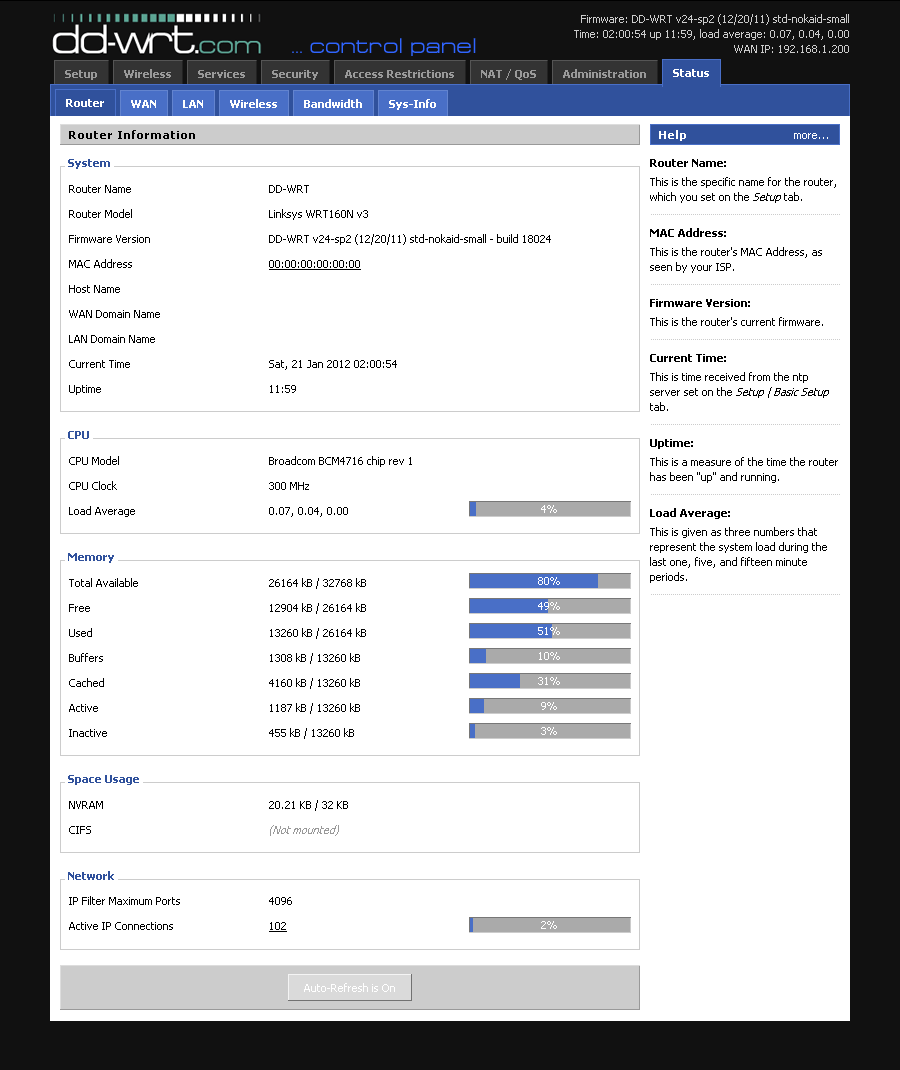
- DD-WRT's Web interface
- Developer: Sebastian Gottschall / NewMedia-NET
- Release: 22 January 2005; 21 years ago
- Stable release: v24 SP1 (Build 10020) / 27 July 2008; 18 years ago
- Preview release: 3.0 rolling beta
- Type: Router operating system
- License: Various proprietary and free software
- Website: dd-wrt.com
- Repository: svn.dd-wrt.com

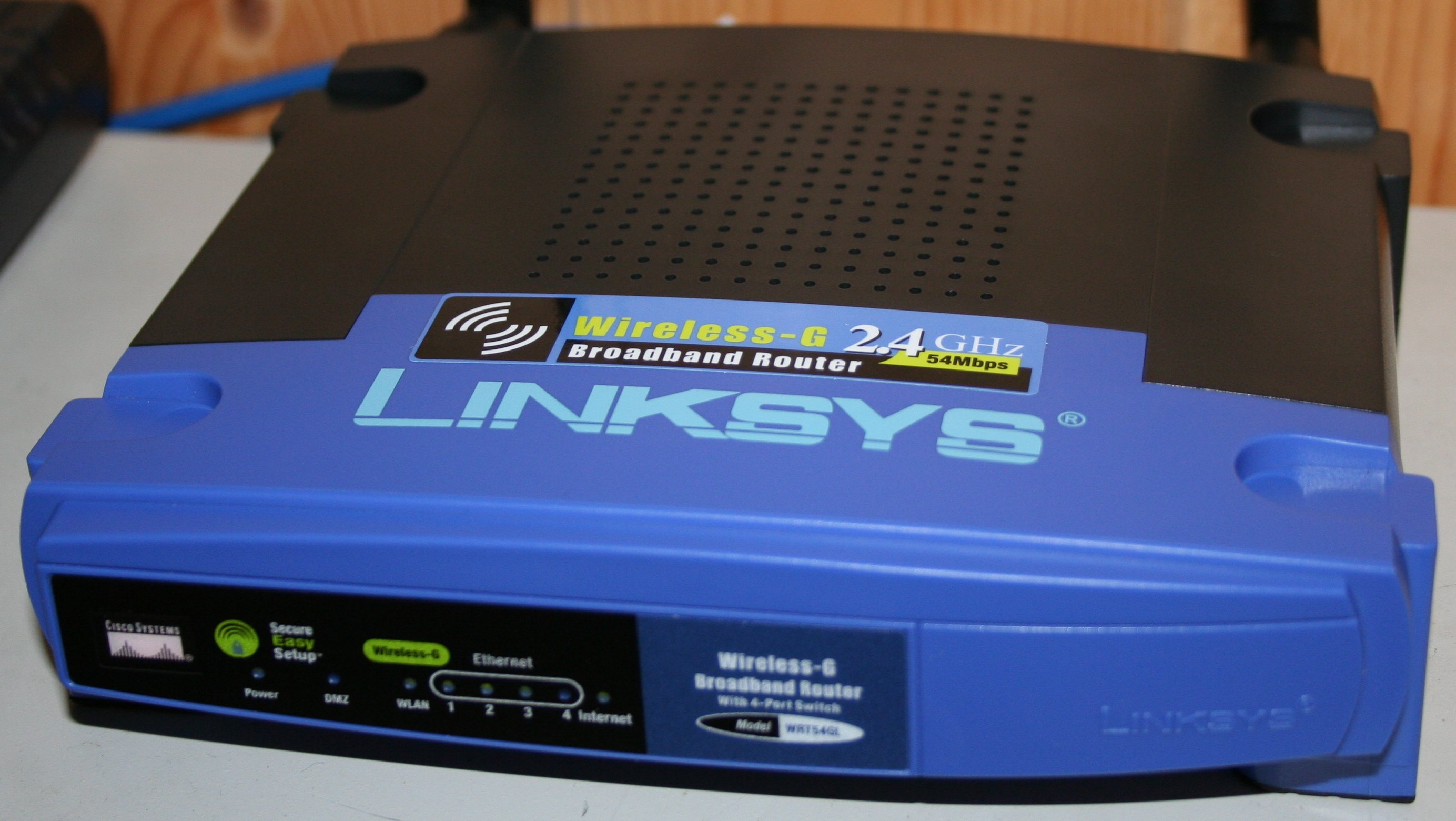
DD-WRT was originally designed for the Linksys WRT54G series, but now runs on a variety of routers.

DD-WRT is Linux-based firmware for wireless routers and access points. Originally designed for the Linksys WRT54G series, it now runs on a wide variety of models. DD-WRT is one of a handful of third-party firmware projects designed to replace manufacturer's original firmware with custom firmware offering additional features or functionality.

Sebastian Gottschall, a.k.a. "BrainSlayer", is the founder and primary maintainer of the DD-WRT project. The letters "DD" in the project name are the German license-plate letters for vehicles from Dresden, where the development team lived. The remainder of the name was taken from the Linksys WRT54G model router, a home router popular in 2002–2004. WRT is assumed to be a reference to 'wireless router'.

Buffalo Technology and other companies have shipped routers with factory-installed, customized versions of DD-WRT. In January 2016, Linksys started to offer DD-WRT firmware for their routers.

== Features ==
Among the common features of DD-WRT are

- access control
- bandwidth monitoring
- quality of service
- WPA/WPA2/WPA3 (personal and enterprise)
- iptables and IPset (on some models) & SPI firewall
- Universal Plug and Play
- Wake-on-LAN
- Dynamic DNS
- AnchorFree VPN
- wireless access point configuration
- WDS - Wireless Distribution System
- APuP - Access Point Micro Peering
- multiple SSIDs
- overclocking
- transmission power control
- Transmission BitTorrent client
- Tor
- router linking
- ssh
- telnet
- RADIUS support
- XLink Kai networks
- OpenVPN
- WireGuard

Version-specific features
Feature	Micro (2 MB) (Note: "Micro" builds additionally require 128 kB of Common Firmware Environment storage)	Mini (4 MB)	Nokaid (4 MB)	Standard (4 MB)	VOIP (4 MB)	VPN (4 MB) (Note: Smaller VPN JFFS builds are available for 4 MB units.)	Mega (Note: Only on DD-WRT v24) (8 MB)
ChilliSpot			Yes				Yes
Web management over HTTPS			Yes				
IPv6			Yes		Yes		
JFFS2		Yes					Yes
XLink Kai daemon				Yes			Yes
MMC & SD card support			Yes				
NoCat			Yes				
OpenVPN						Yes	
PPTP client		Yes					
radvd	Yes				Yes		Yes
RFlow (traffic information)			Yes				
Samba/CIFS client			Yes				
Milkfish SIP router					Yes		Yes
SNMP			Yes				
Secure Shell daemon		Yes					
Wiviz		Yes					

It is also possible to build a bespoke firmware package.

== Version history ==
Version	Release date	Changes	Refs
16	22 January 2005	Initial release. Created as a branch of Sveasoft Alchemy, which, in turn, is based on the Linksys WRT54G firmware	
22	25 July 2005	?	
23	25 December 2005	Replaced the Alchemy kernel with the OpenWrt kernel	
23 SP 1	16 May 2006	In this service pack, much of the code was overhauled and rewritten during the development of this release; many new features were added.	
23 SP 2	14 September 2006	The interface was overhauled, and some new features were added. Some additional router models are supported.	
24	18 May 2008	Allows up to 16 virtual interfaces with different SSIDs and encryption protocols. It can run on some PowerPC, IXP425-based router boards, Atheros WiSOC, and X86-based systems. It can also run to some extent on routers with low flash memory (ex. WRT54Gv8 or WRT54GSv7)	
24 SP 1	26 July 2008	Critical DNS security fix for an issue in dnsmasq, site survey security fixes, longer passwords, and flexible OpenVPN configurations. It can also run on additional hardware, including WRT300 v1.1, WRT310N, WRT600N, Tonze AP42X Pronghorn SBC, Ubiquiti LSX and Netgear, Belkin, and USR devices.	
3.0 beta	rolling	Since 2010, the DD-WRT developers have frequently published beta builds for various routers. In January 2018 WireGuard was made available for routers with 8 MB or more flash and has been updated regularly by BrainSlayer. Due to inevitable security improvements in the Linux kernel and other packages, over such a long time, the 3.0 beta releases are now considered more stable than 24SP1 version.	

== Router hardware supported ==
DD-WRT supports many different router models, both new and obsolete. The project maintains a full list of currently supported models and known incompatible devices.

== See also ==
- BusyBox
- OpenWrt
- List of router firmware projects
