= Wireless router =

Computer networking device

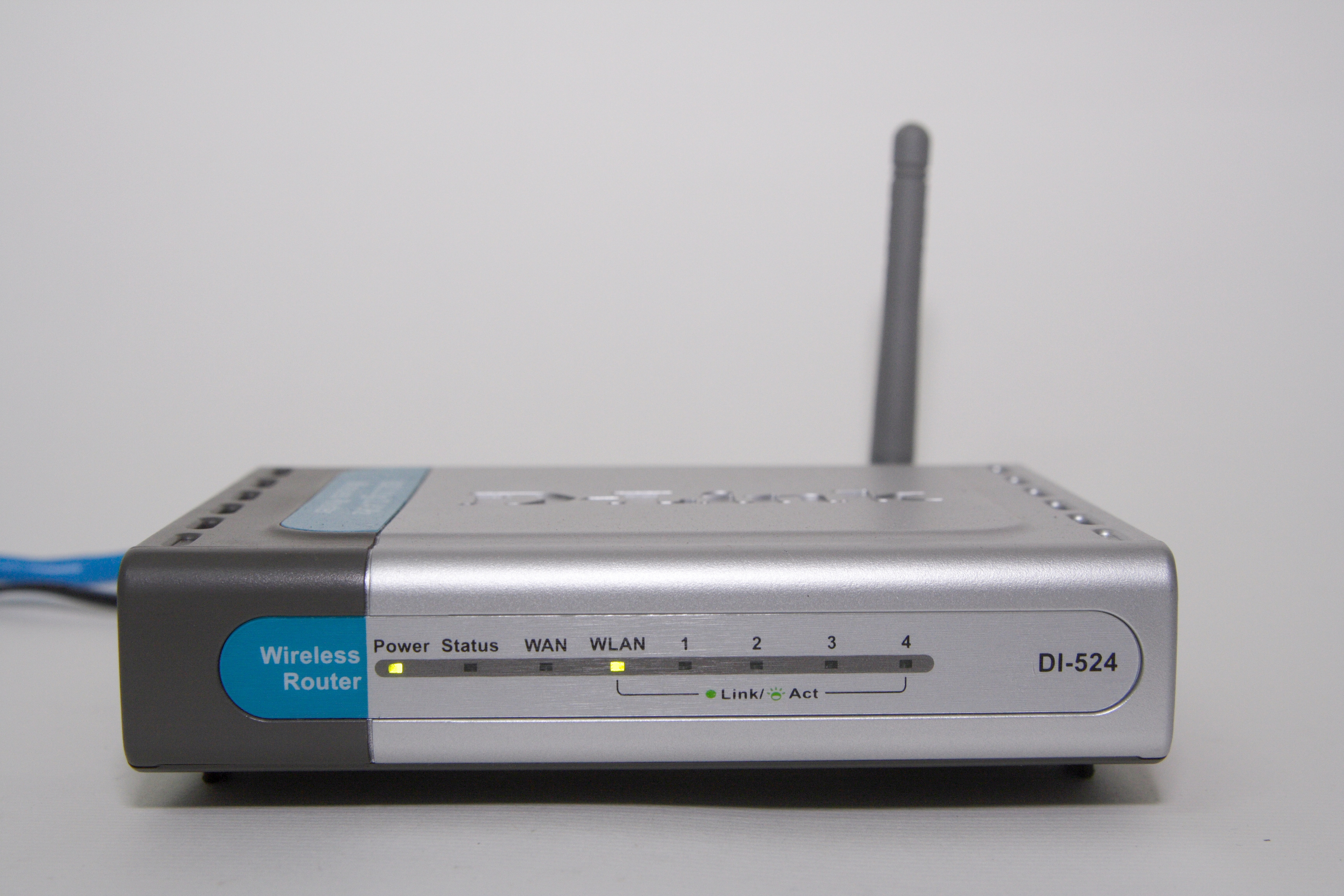
An early example of a wireless router

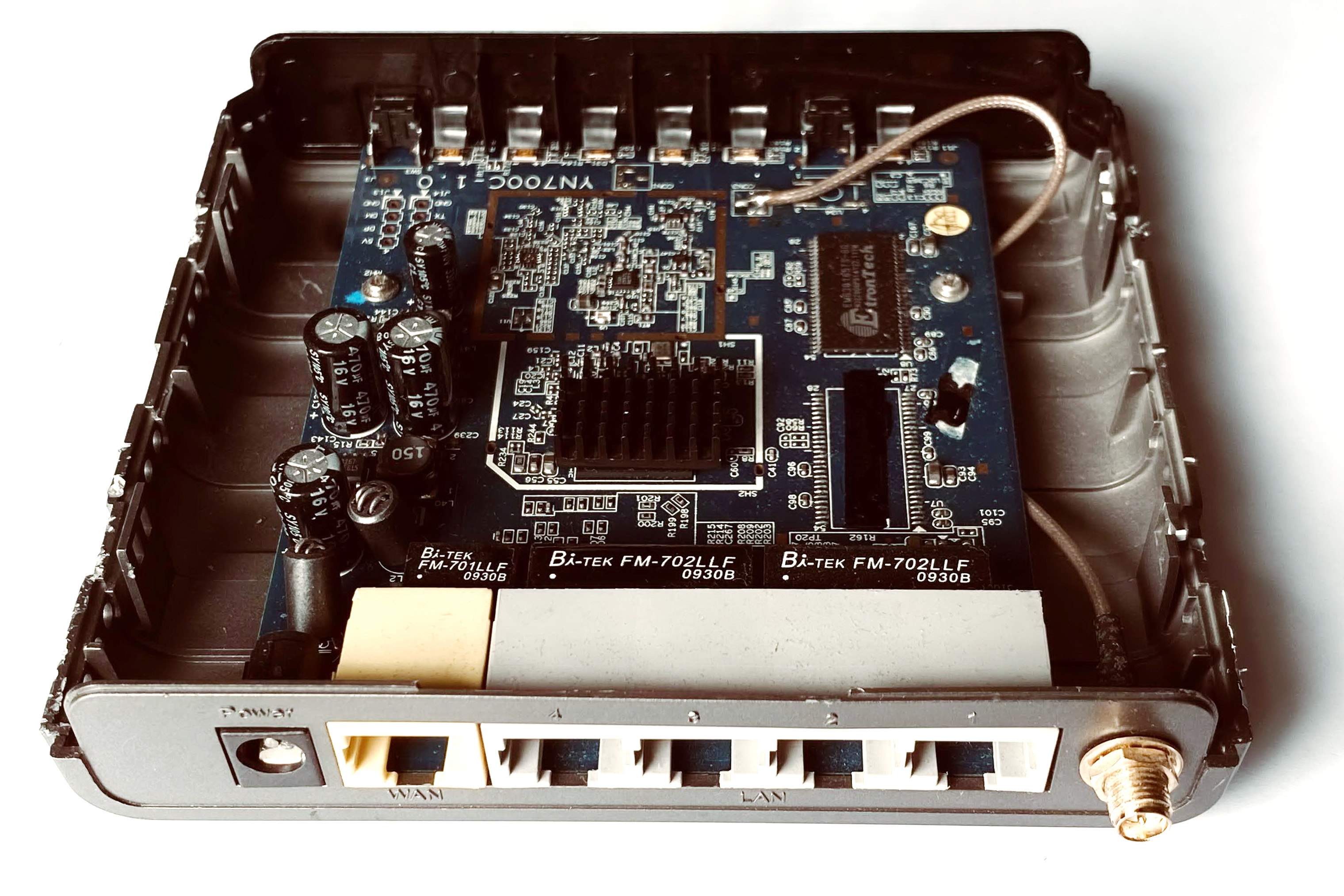
The internal components of a wireless router

A wireless router or Wi-Fi router is a device that performs the functions of a router and also includes the functions of a wireless access point. It is used to provide access to the Internet or a private computer network. Depending on the manufacturer and model, it can function in a wired local area network, in a wireless-only LAN, or in a mixed wired and wireless network.

== Features ==
Wireless routers typically feature one or more network interface controllers supporting Fast Ethernet or Gigabit Ethernet ports integrated into the main system on a chip (SoC) around which the router is built. An Ethernet switch as described in IEEE 802.1Q may interconnect multiple ports. Some routers implement link aggregation through which two or more ports may be used together, improving throughput and redundancy.

All wireless routers feature one or more wireless network interface controllers. These are also integrated into the main SoC or may be separate chips on the printed circuit board. It can also be a distinct card connected over a MiniPCI or MiniPCIe interface. Some dual-band wireless routers operate the 2.4 GHz and 5 GHz bands simultaneously. Wireless controllers support a part of the IEEE 802.11-standard family and many dual-band wireless routers have data transfer rates exceeding 300 Mbit/s (For 2.4 GHz band) and 450 Mbit/s (For 5 GHz band). Some wireless routers provide multiple streams, allowing multiples of data transfer rates (e.g., a three-stream wireless router allows transfers of up to 1.3 Gbit/s on the 5 GHz bands).

Some wireless routers have one or two USB ports. These can be used to connect a printer or hard disk drive to be used as a shared resource on the network. A USB port may also be used for connecting mobile broadband modem, aside from connecting the wireless router to an Ethernet with xDSL or cable modem. A mobile broadband USB adapter can be connected to the router to share the mobile broadband Internet connection through the wireless network. Some wireless routers come with either xDSL modem, DOCSIS modem, LTE modem, or fiber optic modem integrated.

== Operating system ==
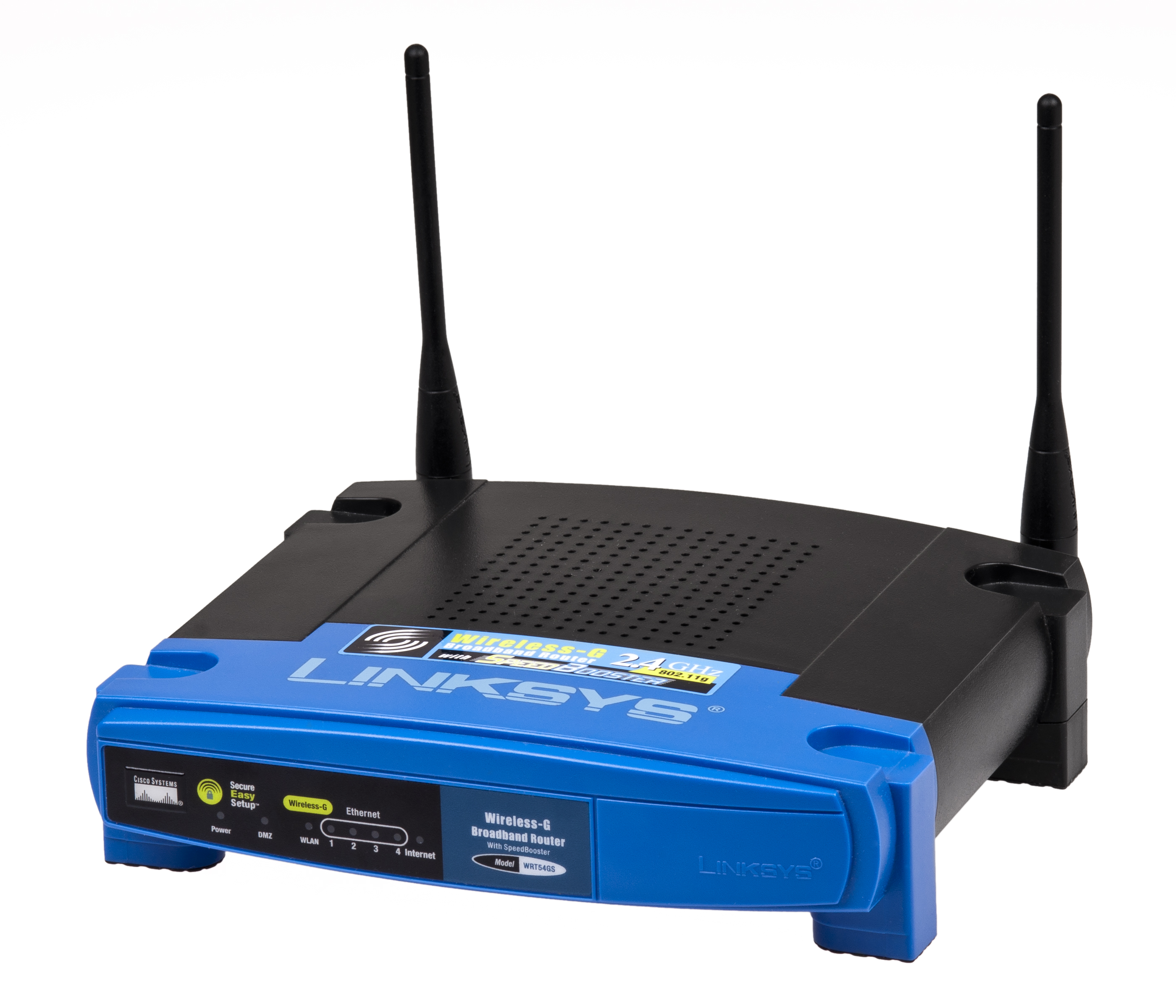
The WRT54G wireless router supporting only 802.11b and 802.11g. Its OEM firmware gave birth to OpenWrt

The most common operating system on such embedded devices is Linux. Less frequently, VxWorks is used. The devices are configured over a web user interface served by a light web server software running on the device. It is possible for a computer running a desktop operating system with appropriate software to act as a wireless router. This is commonly referred to as a SoftAP.

In 2003, Linksys was forced to open-source the firmware of its WRT54G router series (the best-selling routers of all time) after people on the Linux kernel mailing list discovered that it used GPL Linux code. In 2008, Cisco was sued in Free Software Foundation, Inc. v. Cisco Systems, Inc. due to similar issues with Linksys routers. Since then, various open-source projects have built on this foundation, including OpenWrt, DD-WRT, and Tomato.

In 2016, various manufacturers changed their firmware to block custom installations after an FCC ruling. However, some companies plan to continue to officially support open-source firmware, including Linksys and Asus.

== See also ==
- Wi-Fi Protected Setup
