= Tomato (firmware) =

Custom consumer network appliance firmware

Tomato Firmware
- Original author: Jonathan Zarate
- Developer: Tomato Project
- Release: December 2006; 19 years ago
- Final release: 1.28 / 28 June 2010
- Written in: C++
- Operating system: Linux
- Platform: MIPS, ARM
- Type: Routing software
- License: Freeware; Backend: GNU General Public License; Frontend: proprietary
- Website: https://www.polarcloud.com/tomato

FreshTomato
- Stable release: 2026.4 / 14 September 2026
- Platform: ARM, MIPS
- Website: https://freshtomato.org
- Repository: https://github.com/FreshTomato-Project

Tomato is a family of community-developed, custom firmware for consumer-grade computer networking routers and gateways powered by Broadcom chipsets. The firmware has been continually forked and modded by multiple individuals and organizations, with the most up-to-date fork provided by the FreshTomato project.

== History ==
Tomato was originally released by Jonathan Zarate in 2006, using the Linux kernel and drawing extensively on the code of HyperWRT. It was targeted at many popular routers of the time, most notably the older Linksys WRT54G series and Buffalo AirStation. His final release of the original Tomato firmware came in June 2010, by which point its popularity had grown large enough that development and support continued through the user community, resulting in a series of releases (dubbed "mods") by individual users or teams of them that continues to the present day.

Fedor Kozhevnikov created a notable early mod he called TomatoUSB, which ceased development in November 2010. It was then forked by other developers and remains the nearest common ancestor to all of the forks with any recent activity. The project saw a boost in recognition when Tomato was chosen by Asus as the base used to build the firmware currently preinstalled on their entire line of home routers, ASUSWRT.

Currently, FreshTomato appears to be the only project that has seen active development and new releases.

== Features ==
Several notable features have been part of Tomato long enough to be common to all forks, among them are:

- The graphical user interface (accessed via web browser), including:
  - Access to almost the entirety of the features provided by the hardware (manufacturers typically omit many of these from their firmware to prevent misuse and reduce support costs)
  - Extensive use of Ajax to display only the settings that are germane to the device's current setup, reducing confusion and keeping related options near each other using fewer pages/tabs
  - A CSS-based custom interface theming
  - SVG-based graphical bandwidth monitoring, showing total network inbound/outbound activity and that of each connected device through pie charts and line graphs that update in real-time
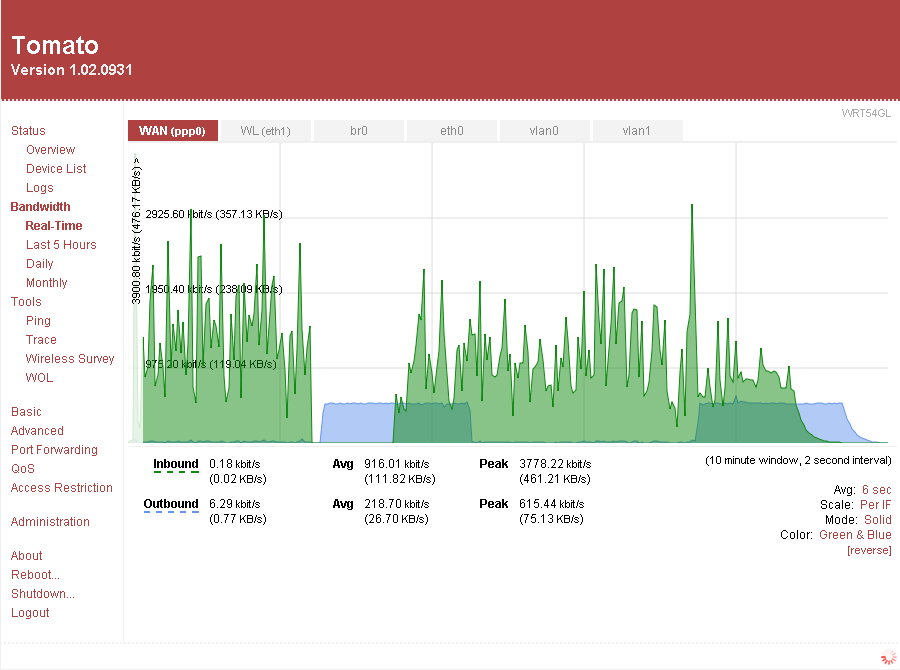
    Tomato live bandwidth monitor
- A personal web server (Nginx) that uses the device's "always on, always connected" design to allow users to host their own websites from home for free
- Access and bandwidth restriction configurable for each device or the network as a whole, providing control over the speed and amount of traffic available at any time to any device
- Unrestricted access to the internal system logs and the ability to store them for easier troubleshooting and security audits
- CLI access (BusyBox) via the web-based interface, as well as via Telnet or SSH (using Dropbear)
- Wake-on-LAN
- Advanced QoS: 10 unique QoS classes defined, real-time graphs display prioritized traffic with traffic class details
- Client bandwidth control via QoS classes
- The Dnsmasq software built-in, which provides:
  - DHCP server (with static allocation of IP addresses)
  - Local DNS server (usually forwarding requests to the DNS provider of choice)
- Wireless modes:
  - Access point (AP)
  - Wireless client station (STA)
  - Wireless Ethernet (WET) bridge
  - Wireless distribution system (WDS also known as wireless bridging)
  - Simultaneous AP and WDS (also known as wireless repeating)
- Dynamic DNS service with ezUpdate and services extended for more providers
- SES button control
- JFFS2
- SMB client
- Wireless LAN Adjustment of radio transmit power, antenna selection, and 14 wireless channels
- 'Boot wait' protection (increase the time slot for uploading firmware via the boot loader)
- Advanced port forwarding, redirection, and triggering with UPnP and NAT-PMP
- Init, shutdown, firewall, and WAN Up scripts
- Uptime, load average, and free memory status
- Minimal reboots – Very few configuration changes require a reboot
- Wireless survey page to view other networks in your neighborhood
- More comprehensive dashboard than stock firmware: displays signal strengths of wireless client devices, reveals UPnP mappings
- Configuration persistence during a firmware upgrade

=== Feature comparison ===
Mod name	Base version	Mod version	Latest release	5 GHz (802.11 a/n/ac/ax)	IPv6	USB support	Memory card support	VPN protocols (Note: Firmware supports listed protocols in client and server modes unless specified)	SFTP	Virtual LANs
TomatoVPN (SgtPepperKSU)	1.27 (Note: Tomato standard and ND)	1.27vpn3.6	Jan 2010	No	No	No	No	OpenVPN	No	No
Tomato	1.28 (Note: Tomato standard only)	1.28	Jun 2010	No	No	No	No	No	No	No
Tomato ND	1.28 (Note: Tomato ND (New Driver) only)	1.28	Jun 2010	No	No	No	No	No	No	No
SpeedMod (hardc0re)	1.28	120	Jul 2010	No	No	No	No	No	No	No
TomatoUSB (Teddy Bear)	1.28	Build 54	Nov 2010	Yes	Yes	Printer sharing, NAS (CIFS/FTP), DLNA server	No	OpenVPN	Via; Optware	Yes
slodki	1.28	1.28.02	Feb 2011	No	No	Printer sharing, NAS (CIFS/FTP)	SD, SDHC, MMC	OpenVPN	Via; Optware	No
DualWAN	1.28	1.28.0542	Jan 2012	No	Yes	Printer sharing, NAS (CIFS/FTP), DLNA server, 3G Modem	No	OpenVPN, PPTP	Via; Optware	Yes
Teaman	1.28	v0025	Jun 2012	Yes	Yes	Printer sharing, NAS (CIFS/FTP), 3G Modem	SD, SDHC, MMC	OpenVPN, PPTP (server)	Via; Optware	With GUI
EasyTomato	1.28	0.8	Jun 2013	Yes	Yes	Printer sharing, NAS (CIFS/NFSv3/FTP), DLNA server, 3G Modem	SD, SDHC, MMC	OpenVPN, PPTP	Via; Optware	With GUI
Victek RAF	1.28	1.28.9013 R1.3	Jul 2014	Yes	Yes	Printer sharing, NAS (CIFS/NFSv3/FTP), DLNA server, 3G Modem	SD, SDHC, MMC	OpenVPN, PPTP	Via; Optware	With GUI
Toastman	1.28	RT: 1.28.7511.5; RT‑N: 1.28.0511.5; ARM: 1.28.9008.8	Jan 2017	Yes	Yes	Printer sharing, NAS (CIFS/NFSv3/FTP), DLNA server, 3G Modem	SD, SDHC, MMC	OpenVPN, PPTP	Via Entware-ng or Optware-ng	With GUI
Shibby	1.28	v140‑MultiWAN	May 2017	Yes	Yes	Printer sharing, NAS (CIFS/NFSv3/FTP), DLNA server, 3G/LTE Modem, UPS monitoring	SD, SDHC, SDXC, MMC	OpenVPN, PPTP, L2TP (client), tinc (server)	Via Entware or Optware-ng	With GUI
AdvancedTomato V2	1.28	3.5-140	Nov 2017	Yes	Yes	Printer sharing, NAS (CIFS/NFSv3/FTP), DLNA server, 3G/LTE Modem and UPS monitoring	SD, SDHC, SDXC, MMC	OpenVPN, PPTP, L2TP (client), tinc (server)	Via Entware or Optware-ng	With GUI
FreshTomato‑ARM and FreshTomato‑MIPS	1.28	2026.4	Sep 2026	Yes	Yes	Printer sharing, NAS (SMB2/NFSv4/FTP), DLNA server, 3G/LTE Modem and UPS monitoring	SD, SDHC, SDXC, MMC	OpenVPN, PPTP, L2TP (client), tinc (server)	Via Entware or Optware-ng	With GUI
Mod name	Base version	Mod version	Latest release	5 GHz (802.11 a/n/ac/ax)	IPv6	USB support	Memory card support	VPN protocols	SFTP	Virtual LANs

==== Feature comparison (cont.) ====
Name	Static ARP	Bandwidth limiter	NFS server	BitTorrent client	Guest WiFi	PPPoE server	DNSCrypt	CPU overclocking	Tor client	IPsec	Multi-WAN	Siproxd VoIP	Web server	LED control	Theming	P2Partisan	SNMP	Captive portal	Per-IP traffic stats
TomatoVPN (SgtPepperKSU)	No	No	No	No	No	No	No	No	No	No	No	No	No	No	No	No	No	No	No
Tomato	No	No	No	No	No	No	No	No	No	No	No	No	No	No	No	No	No	No	No
Tomato ND	No	No	No	No	No	No	No	No	No	No	No	No	No	No	No	No	No	No	No
SpeedMod (hardc0re)	No	No	No	No	No	No	No	No	No	No	No	No	No	No	No	No	No	No	No
TomatoUSB (Teddy Bear)	No	No	No	No	No	No	No	No	No	No	No	No	No	No	No	No	No	Yes	No
slodki	No	No	No	No	No	No	No	No	No	No	No	No	No	No	No	No	No	No	No
DualWAN	Yes	Yes	No	Yes	No	Yes	No	No	No	No	Yes	No	No	No	No	No	Yes	Yes	Yes
Teaman	Yes	Yes	No	No	With; GUI	No	No	No	No	No	No	No	No	No	No	No	Yes	Yes	Yes
EasyTomato	Yes	Yes	Version 3	No	With; GUI	No	No	No	No	No	No	No	No	No	No	No	Yes	Yes	Yes
Victek RAF	Yes	VLAN	Version 3	No	With; GUI	No	With; GUI	With; GUI	No	No	No	With; GUI	With; GUI	by script	No	No	Yes	Yes	Yes
Toastman	Yes	Yes	Version 3	No	With; GUI	No	No	With; GUI	No	No	No	No	No	No	No	No	Yes	Yes	Yes
Shibby	Yes	VLAN	Version 3 (with GUI)	With; GUI	With; GUI	No	With; GUI	Yes	With; GUI	Yes	Yes	No	Yes	Yes	Yes	by script	Yes	Yes	Yes
AdvancedTomato V2	Yes	VLAN	Version 3 (with GUI)	With; GUI	With; GUI	No	With; GUI	Yes	With; GUI	Yes	Yes	No	Yes	Yes	Yes	by script	Yes	Yes	Yes
FreshTomato‑ARM and FreshTomato‑MIPS	Yes	VLAN	Version 4 (with GUI)	With; GUI	With; GUI	No	With; GUI	Yes	With; GUI	Yes	Yes	No	Yes	Yes	Yes	by script	Yes	Yes	Yes
Name	Static ARP	Bandwidth limiter	NFS server	BitTorrent client	Guest WiFi	PPPoE server	DNSCrypt	CPU overclocking	Tor client	IPsec	Multi-WAN	Siproxd VoIP	Web server	LED control	Theming	P2Partisan	SNMP	Captive portal	Per-IP traffic stats

== See also ==
- List of wireless router firmware projects
