= DebWRT =

- OS family: Linux (Unix-like)
- Working state: Discontinued
- Source model: Open source
- Initial release: February 2009
- Latest release: DebWrt 2.0-1 'Angel' / September 26, 2010
- Available in: Over 65 languages
- Update method: APT
- Package manager: dpkg
- Supported platforms: X86-64, PowerPC, SPARC, ARM, MIPS, PA-RISC
- Kernel type: Monolithic (Linux, FreeBSD), Micro (Hurd)
- Userland: GNU
- License: Free software licenses (mainly GPL), and other licenses
- Official website: www.debwrt.net

DebWrt is a discontinued, niche Linux distribution mainly installed on embedded systems (e.g. residential gateways). It was built on top of an OpenWrt base which was used to load a fully functional version of Debian from the RootFS stored on the attached USB storage device. For easy installation and deinstallation of packages it relied on the dpkg Package management system. DebWrt used the command-line interface of Bash. There was no web-based GUI.

== Features ==
DebWrt offered all of the features provided in the stock firmware for residential gateways, such as DHCP services and wireless encryption via WEP, Wi-Fi Protected Access and WPA2. In addition it offered all of the features offered by Debian that are typically not included in a standard firmware.

Features included:

- Package manager apt-get
- Extensible configuration of your network involving VLAN with exhaustive possibilities to configure the routing itself
- Customizable methods to filter, manipulate, delay and rearrange network packets:
- Static DHCP leases
  - Other devices with available Linux drivers
- Regular bug fixes and updates, even for devices no longer supported by their manufacturers

DebWrt had a fully writable file system, which allowed for package management via the dpkg package system, allowing users to install new software to meet their individual needs. This contrasted with Linux-based firmware built using a read-only SquashFS filesystem (or similar) that offered efficient compression but no way to modify the installed software without rebuilding and flashing a complete firmware image.

== Versions ==
- 2.0: Angel - 2009 February

== See also ==
- List of router firmware projects
