= Linksys WRT54G series =

Series of wireless routers manufactured by Linksys

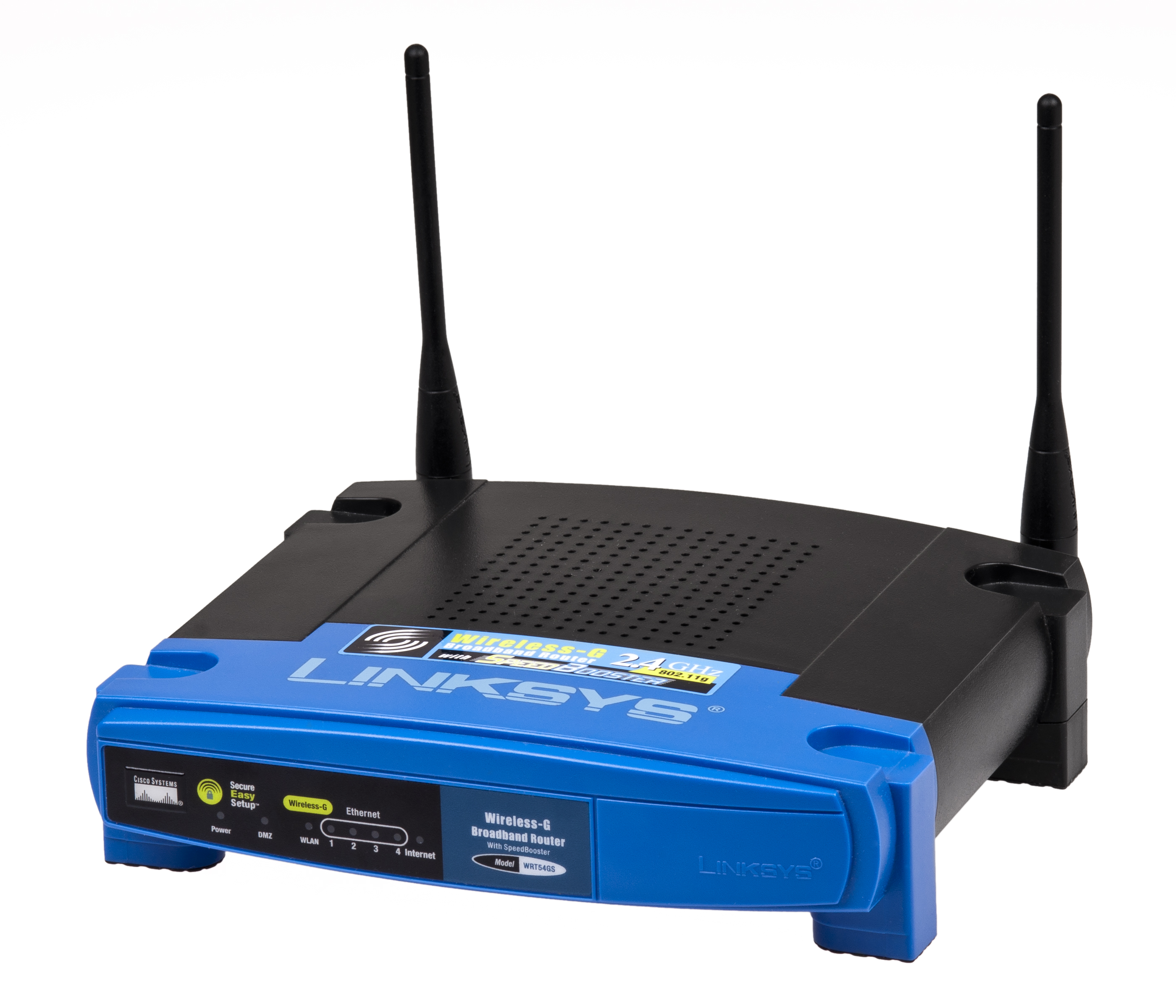
The Linksys WRT54GS

The Linksys WRT54G Wi-Fi series is a series of Wi-Fi–capable residential gateways marketed by Linksys. A residential gateway connects a local area network (such as a home network) to a wide area network (such as the Internet).

Models in this series use one of various 32-bit MIPS processors. All WRT54G models support Fast Ethernet for wired data links, and 802.11b/g for wireless data links.

== Hardware and revisions ==
=== WRT54G ===
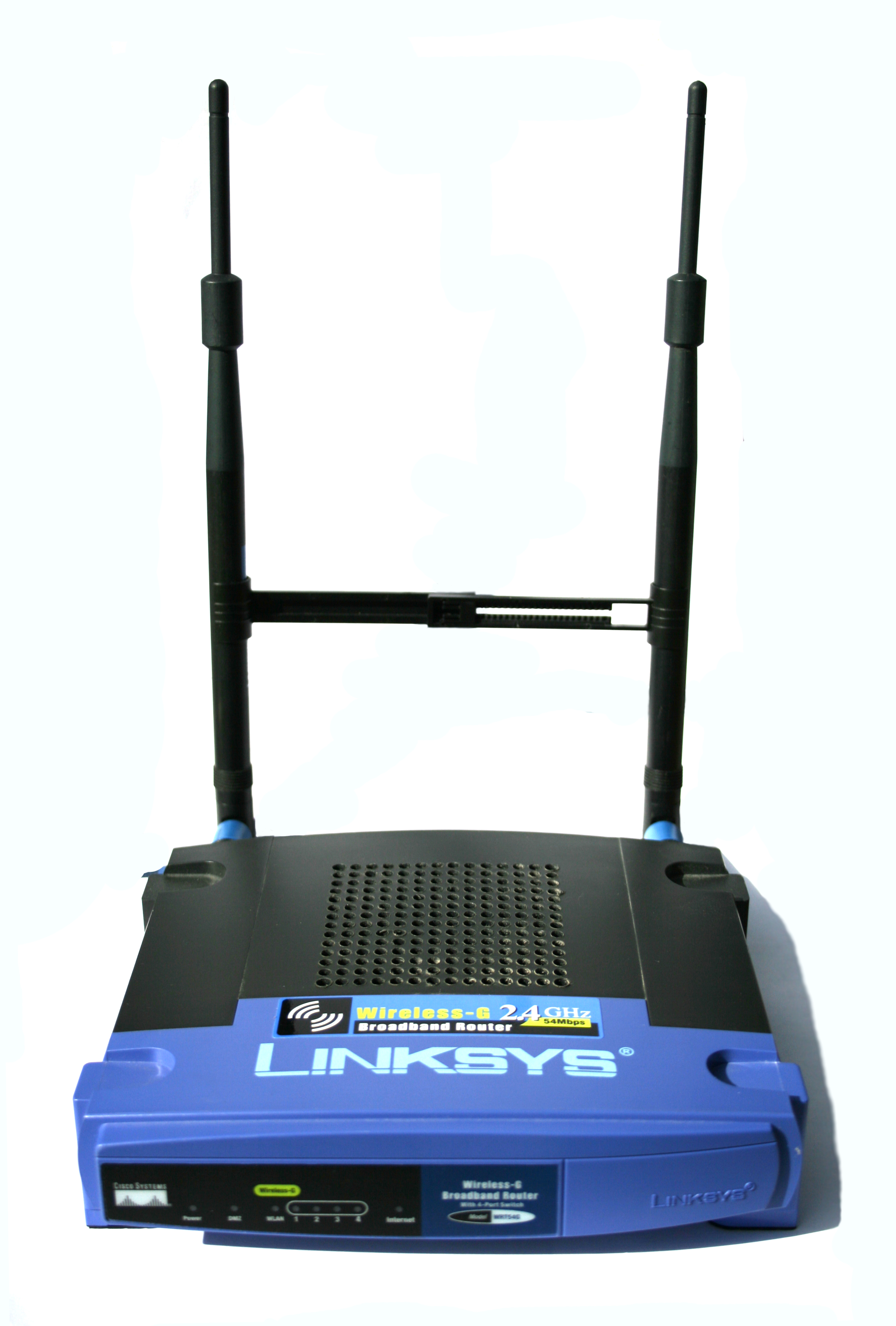
WRT54G version 2.0 with upgraded antennas

The original WRT54G was first released in December 2002. It has a 4+1 port network switch (the Internet/WAN port is part of the same internal network switch, but on a different VLAN). The devices have two removable antennas connected through Reverse Polarity TNC connectors. The WRT54GC router is an exception and has an internal antenna with optional external antenna.

As a cost-cutting measure, as well as to satisfy FCC rules that prohibit fitting external antennas with higher gain, the design of the latest version of the WRT54G no longer has detachable antennas or TNC connectors. Instead, version 8 routers simply route thin wires into antenna 'shells' eliminating the connector. As a result, Linksys HGA7T and similar external antennas are no longer compatible with this model.

Until version 5, WRT54G shipped with Linux-based firmware.

| Version | CPU | RAM | Flash memory | S/N Prefix | Power | Notes |
|---|---|---|---|---|---|---|
| 1.0 | Broadcom BCM4702 @ 125 MHz | 16 MB | 4 MB | CDF0; CDF1 | 5 V 2 A positive tip | 20 front panel LEDs (including link/activity, collision detection and speed rating indicators for each Fast Ethernet port). Wireless capability was provided by a Mini PCI card attached to the router motherboard |
| 1.1 | Broadcom BCM4710 @ 125 MHz | 16 MB | 4 MB | CDF2; CDF3 | 12 V 1 A positive tip | Front panel LEDs reduced to eight (one link/activity LED per port, plus one each for power, wireless, DMZ and WAN/Internet connectivity). Wireless chipset is integrated onto motherboard. Note: some of the routers have BCM4702 CPU |
| 2.0 | Broadcom BCM4712 @ 200 MHz | 16 MB | 4 MB | CDF5 | 12 V 1 A positive tip | Same as 1.1 with a CPU upgrade and greater wireless transmitter integration (fewer transmitter parts). Some of these have 32 MB of RAM but are locked to 16 MB in the firmware (can be unlocked to use all RAM — see (general info) and (for an XB card) and (for an XH card)). |
| 2.1 | Broadcom BCM4712 @ 216 MHz | 16 MB | 4 MB | CDF6 | 12 V 1 A positive tip | Same physical appearance as 1.1 and 2.0 models. Some of these models have 32 MB of RAM installed but have been locked to 16 MB by the manufacturer. Some models have two 16 MB MIRA P2V28S40BTP memory chips. |
| 2.2 | Broadcom BCM4712 @ 216 MHz | 16 MB | 4 MB | CDF7 | 12 V 1 A positive tip | Same physical appearance as 1.1 and 2.0 models. Switching chipsets from ADMtek 6996L to Broadcom BCM5325EKQM. Some of these models have 32 MB of RAM installed but have been locked to 16 MB by the manufacturer. Some models have 16 MB Hynix HY5DU281622ET-J memory chips. |
| 3.0 | Broadcom BCM4712 @ 216 MHz | 16 MB | 4 MB | CDF8 | 12 V 1 A positive tip | Identical to 1.1 and later models, except for the CPU speed and an undocumented switch behind left front panel intended for use with a feature called "SecureEasySetup". |
| 3.1 | Broadcom BCM4712 @ 216 MHz | 16 MB | 4 MB | CDF9 | 12 V 1 A positive tip | The Version 3.1 hardware is essentially the same as the Version 3.0 hardware. Adds "SecureEasySetup" button. |
| 4.0 | Broadcom BCM5352 @ 200 MHz | 16 MB | 4 MB | CDFA | 12 V 1 A positive tip | Switched to new SoC |
| 5.0 | Broadcom BCM5352 @ 200 MHz | 8 MB | 2 MB | CDFB | 12 V 0.5 A positive tip | Switched to VxWorks OS and reduced flash memory and RAM; not compatible with most third-party firmware, although the "VxWorks killer" utility allows some third-party open source firmware to be loaded. Since less physical RAM is available in this and future models, the third-party firmware (popular open source projects) were modified into special "micro" versions. |
| 5.1 | Broadcom BCM5352 @ 200 MHz | 8 MB | 2 MB | CDFC | 12 V 0.5 A positive tip | |
| 5.2 | Broadcom BCM5352 @ 200 MHz | 8 MB | 2 MB | CDFB | 12 V 0.5 A positive tip | |
| 6.0 | Broadcom BCM5352 @ 200 MHz | 8 MB | 2 MB | CDFD | 12 V 0.5 A positive tip | Also based on VxWorks, will only run DD-WRT micro. VxWorks killer must be used prior to flashing, otherwise, it will refuse to flash. Due to low RAM, users may encounter issues when running P2P software. |
| 7.0 | Atheros AR2317 @ 240 MHz | 8 MB | 2 MB | CDFE | 12 V 0.5 A positive tip | Switched to Atheros SoC. This is the only version of the WRT54G that does not support third-party firmware at all. |
| 7.2 | Broadcom BCM5354 @ 240 MHz | 8 MB | 2 MB | CDFK | 12 V 0.5 A positive tip | Switched back to Broadcom based SoC; Samsung K4S641632K-UC75 (RAM); Samsung K801716UBC PI07 (flash). Micro versions of third-party firmware are supported again. |
| 8.0 | Broadcom BCM5354 @ 240 MHz | 8 MB | 2 MB | CDFF; CDFG | 12 V 0.5 A positive tip | Some units come with 16 MB of RAM. VxWorks killer works. Antennas cannot be removed. |
| 8.1 | Broadcom BCM5354 @ 240 MHz | 8 MB | 2 MB | MDF0 | 12 V 0.5 A positive tip | FCC ID: Q87-WRT54GV81. Operating system is Linux, no need for VxWorks killer. Antennas cannot be removed. |
| 8.2 | Broadcom BCM5354 @ 240 MHz | 8 MB | 2 MB | CDFJ | 12 V 0.5 A positive tip | FCC ID: Q87-WRT54GV82. VxWorks killer does work, dd-wrt is supported, 2 MB of flash memory can be limiting. Antennas cannot be removed. |

=== WRT54GS ===
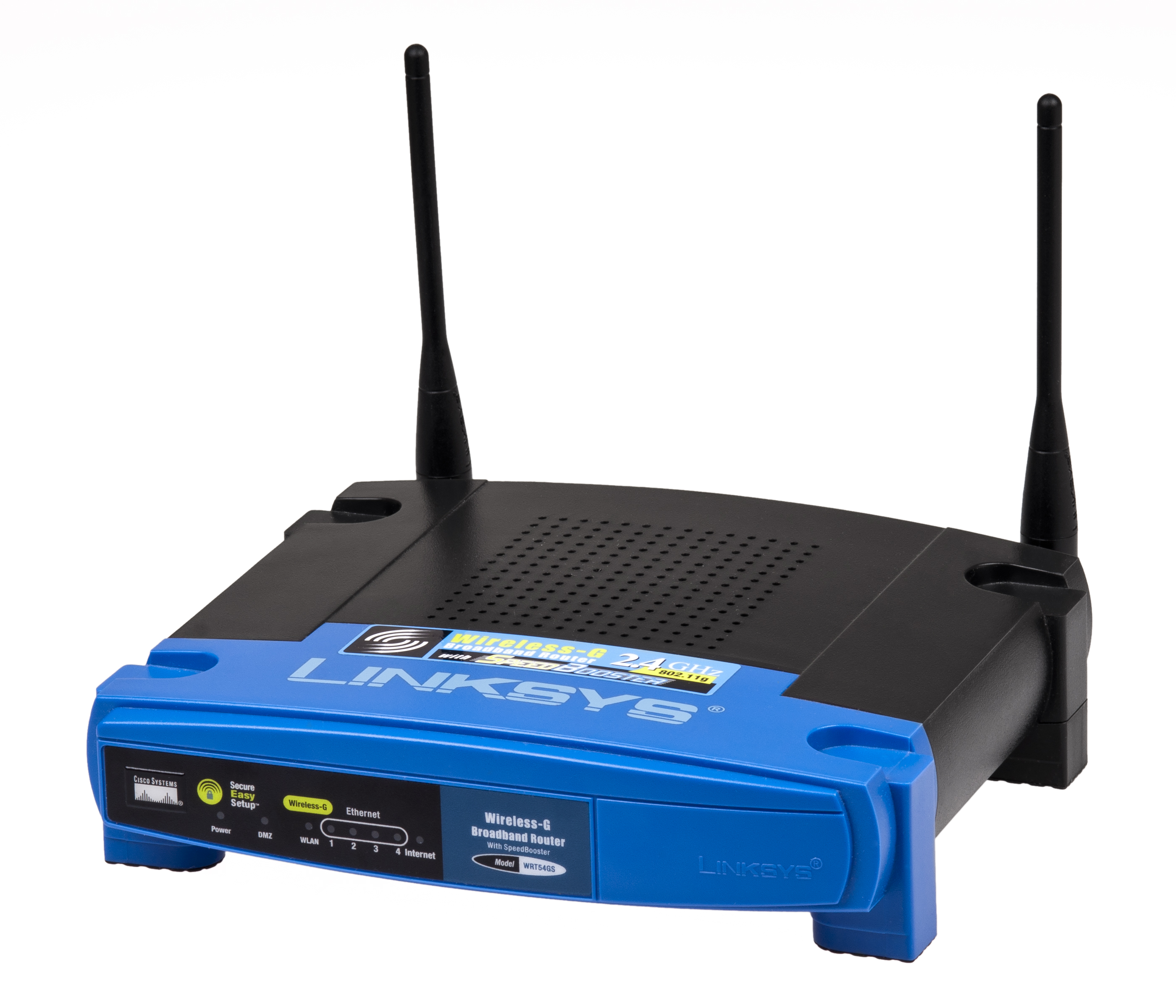
Linksys WRT54GS version 7.2

The WRT54GS is nearly identical to the WRT54G except for additional RAM, flash memory, and SpeedBooster software. Versions 1 to 3 of this router have 8 MB of flash memory. Since most third parties' firmware only use up to 4 MB flash, a JFFS2-based read/write filesystem can be created and used on the remaining 4 MB free flash. This allows for greater flexibility of configurations and scripting, enabling this small router to both load-balance multiple ADSL lines (multi-homed) or to be run as a hardware layer-2 load balancer (with appropriate third party firmware).

| Version | CPU | RAM | Flash memory | S/N Prefix | Notes |
|---|---|---|---|---|---|
| 1.0 | Broadcom BCM4712 @ 200 MHz | 32 MB | 8 MB | CGN0; CGN1 | ADMtek 6996L switch. Added SpeedBooster technology (Broadcom Afterburner technology), claims to boost the throughput of 802.11g by 30% (for maximum boost needs SpeedBooster technology on the other side, but will boost standard 802.11g as well). Has LEDs for Power, DMZ, WLAN, Internet, and 1–4 Ports. |
| 1.1 | Broadcom BCM4712 @ 200 MHz | 32 MB | 8 MB | CGN2 | Switched to Broadcom BCM4712 SoC and BCM5325E switch. |
| 2.0 | Broadcom BCM4712 @ 216 MHz | 32 MB | 8 MB | CGN3 | 10 LED Front Panel (two new ones behind Cisco logo button). Also capable of SecureEasySetup, but use of the logo button and lighting of the new LEDs behind it requires firmware upgrade. SoC chip REV1 or REV 2. The flash chip on this unit is Intel TE28F640. |
| 2.1 | Broadcom BCM4712 @ 216 MHz | 32 MB | 8 MB | CGN4 | Radio chip is changed from BCM2050 to BCM2050KML. |
| 3.0 | Broadcom BCM5352 @ 200 MHz | 32 MB | 8 MB | CGN5 | Switched to newer Broadcom SoC |
| 4.0 | Broadcom BCM5352 @ 200 MHz | 16 MB | 4 MB | CGN6 | Reduced RAM & Flash (a very rare few have 32 MB/8 MB) |
| 5.0 | Broadcom BCM5352 @ 200 MHz | 16 MB | 2 MB | CGN7 | Uses VxWorks OS and reduced Flash Memory; not compatible with most third-party firmware, although the "VxWorks killer" utility allows some third-party open source firmware to be loaded on this and future versions. |
| 5.1 | Broadcom BCM5352 @ 200 MHz | 16 MB | 2 MB | CGN8 | |
| 6.0 | Broadcom BCM5352 @ 200 MHz | 16 MB | 2 MB | CGN9 | |
| 7.0 | Broadcom BCM5354 @ 240 MHz | 16 MB | 2 MB | CGNA; CGNB; CGNC | Switched to newer Broadcom SoC. Newest VxWorks killer works. Antennas can be removed. CGNB and CGNC antennas can be removed. |
| 7.2 | Broadcom BCM5354 @ 240 MHz | 16 MB | 2 MB | CGNE | FCC ID: Q87-WRT54GSV72. Some antennas can be removed. Some refurbished ones have EN29LV160A 16 Mb (2 MiB) Flash and IS42S16800A or K4S281632IUC75 128 Mb (16MiB) RAM |

=== WRT54GL ===
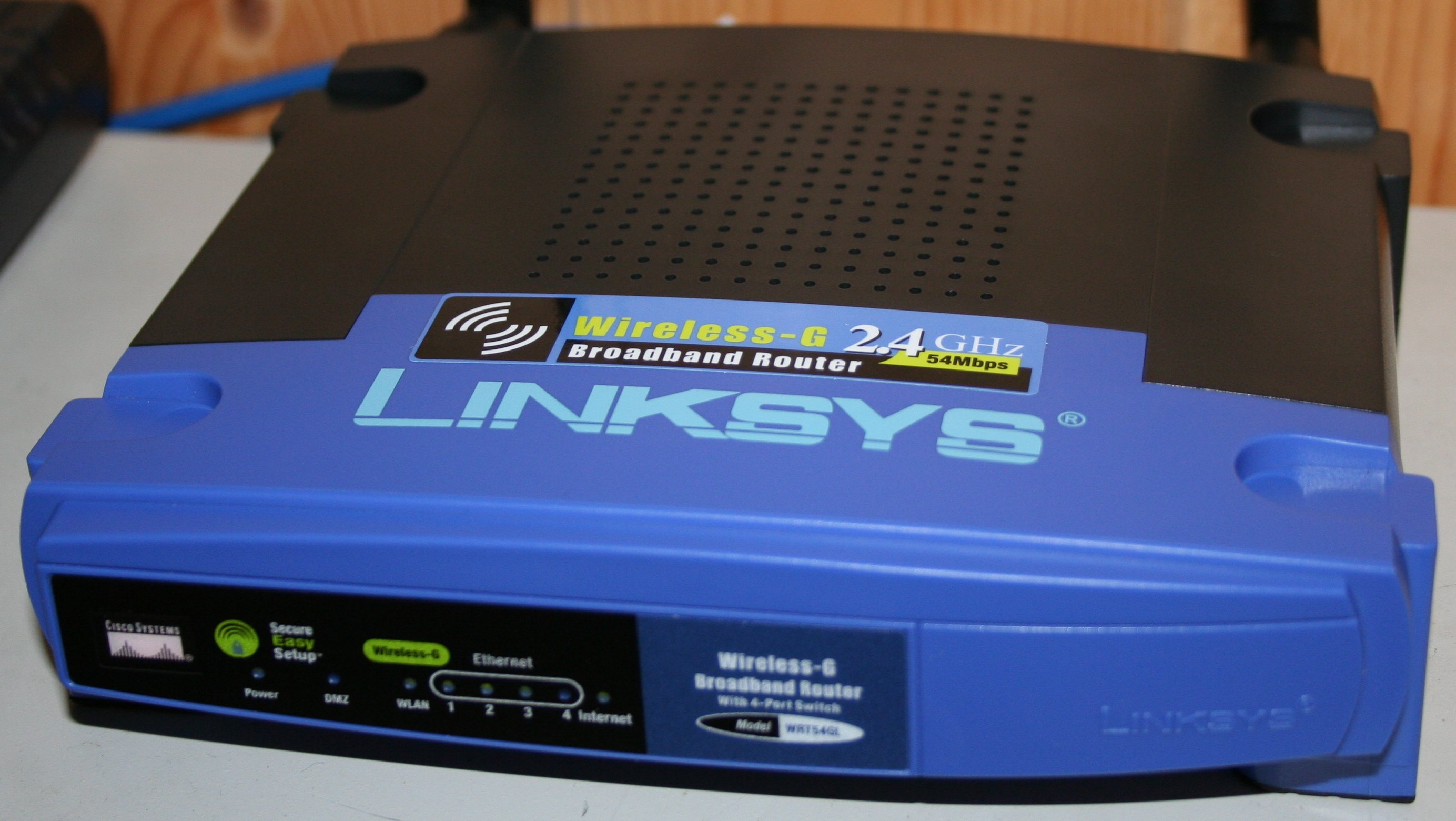
Linksys WRT54GL
Outside view, front

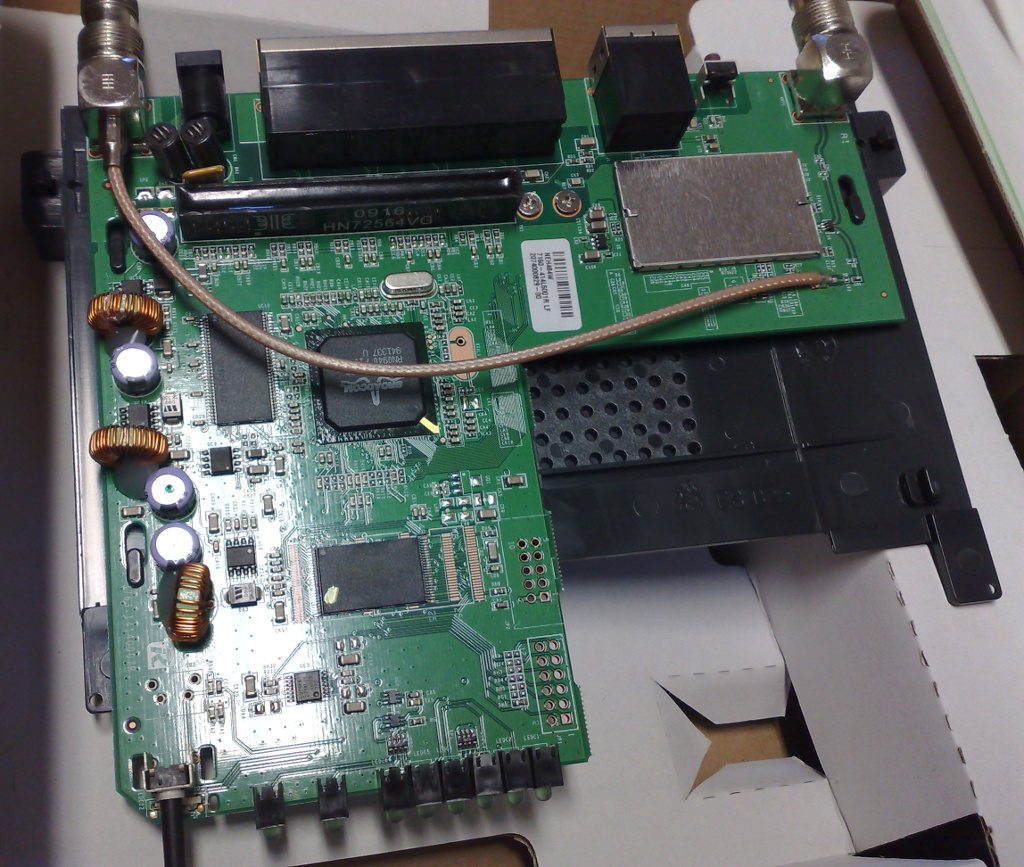
Linksys WRT54GL version 1.1
Circuit board and internals

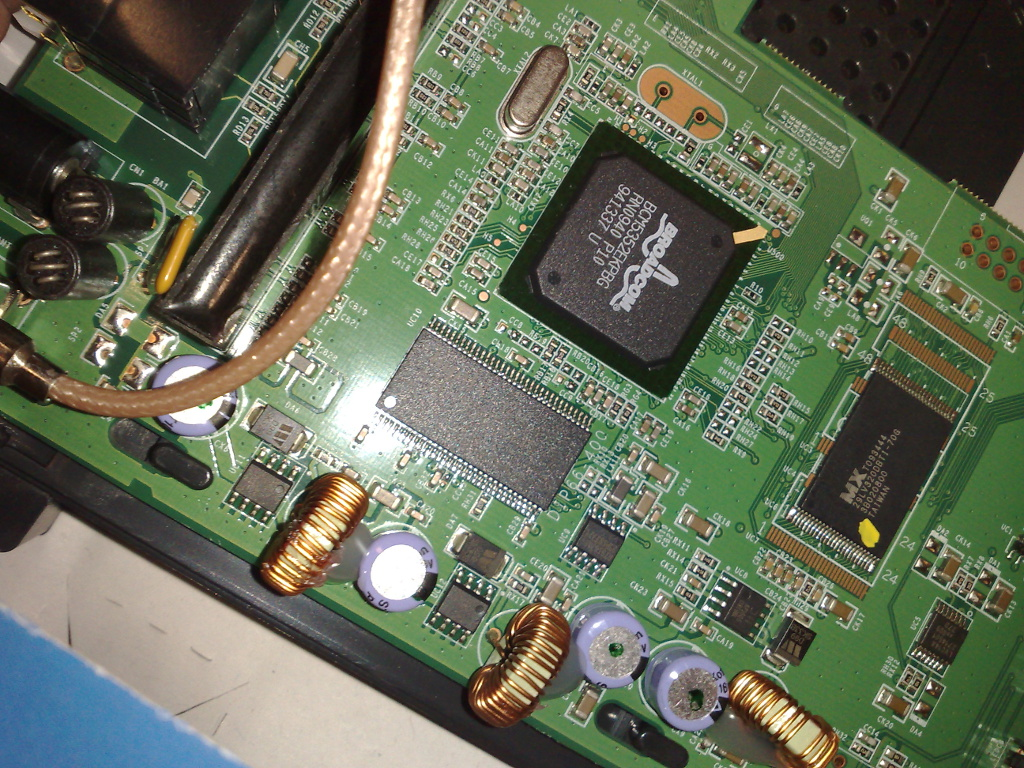
Linksys WRT54GL version 1.1
Close-up of the circuit board

Linksys released the WRT54GL (the best-selling router of all time) in 2005 to support third-party firmware based on Linux, after the original WRT54G line was switched from Linux to VxWorks, starting with version 5. The WRT54GL is technically a reissue of the version 4 WRT54G. Cisco was sued by the FSF for copyright infringement, but the case was settled.

| Version | CPU | RAM | Flash memory | S/N Prefix | Power | Notes |
|---|---|---|---|---|---|---|
| 1.0 | Broadcom BCM5352 @ 200 MHz | 16 MB | 4 MB | CL7A | 12 V 1 A positive tip | New model line, released after the version 5 WRT54G, which returns to a Linux-based OS as opposed to the VxWorks firmware. SpeedBooster is not enabled in stock firmware, however third-party firmware will enable the feature. The hardware is essentially the same as the WRT54G version 4.0. One alteration is that the internal numbering scheme of the 4-port switch changed in this model, from 1 2 3 4, to 3 2 1 0. |
| 1.1 | Broadcom BCM5352 @ 200 MHz | 16 MB | 4 MB | CL7B CL7C CF7C | 12 V 1 A positive tip | Detachable antennas. As of August 2009, this version was shipping with firmware revision 4.30.11. This pre-loaded firmware allows the user to upload a 4 MB firmware image, whereas the pre-loaded firmware on version 1.0 limited the image to 3 MB. Firmware version 4.30.18 is now available for both hardware versions. Fully supported by Tomato, OpenWrt, and DD-WRT. |

=== WRTSL54GS ===
WRTSL54GS is similar to the WRT54GS while adding additional firmware features and a USB 2.0 port (referred to as StorageLink) which can be used for a USB hard disk or flash drive.

Unlike other models, the WRTSL54GS has only a single 1.5 dBi antenna, and it is not removable.

| Version | CPU speed | RAM | Flash memory | S/N Prefix | Notes |
|---|---|---|---|---|---|
| 1.0 | Broadcom BCM4704 @ 264 MHz | 32 MB | 8 MB | CJK0 | Released after the WRT54GS and WRT54GL. Uses Linux-based OS. Includes SpeedBooster support, additional firmware features, and an external USB 2.0 port (StorageLink) for network storage. Uses 8 MB of Intel TE28F640 flash with a Broadcom BCM4704 SoC and ADMtek Ethernet switch. |
| 1.1 | Broadcom BCM4704 @ 264 MHz | 32 MB | 8 MB | CJK11 | Change from SoC rev 8 to rev 9 (unconfirmed) |

=== WRT54GX ===
Linksys WRT54GX version 2

WRT54GX comes with SRX (Speed and Range eXpansion), which uses "True MIMO" technology. It has three antennas and was once marketed as a "Pre-N" router, with eight times the speed and three times the range over standard 802.11g routers.

| Version | CPU speed | RAM | Flash memory | S/N Prefix | Notes |
|---|---|---|---|---|---|
| 1.0 | Broadcom BCM4704 @ 266 MHz | 16 MB | 4 MB | KBG5? | Wireless-G Broadband Router with SRX. |
| 2.0 | Realtek RTL8651B @ 200 MHz | 32 MB | 8 MB | KIO1? | Wireless-G Broadband Router with SRX. |

=== WRT54GP2 and WRTP54G ===
WRT54GP2 has 1 or 2 antennas, and a built-in analog telephony adapter (ATA) with 2 phone lines, but only 3 network ports. "Vonage" WRTP54G has 1 antenna, 2 phone lines, 4 network ports — Same S/N Prefix

| Version | Locked to | RAM | Flash memory | S/N Prefix | Notes |
|---|---|---|---|---|---|
| EA | Engin | 32 MB | 8 MB | CJJ0 CGZ0 on WRT54GP2 | Wireless-G Broadband Router with 2 Phone Ports. Uses the Sipura Chipset |

=== WRT54GX2 ===
WRT54GX2 has 2 antennas, and was advertised to have up to 6 times the speed and 2 times the range over standard 802.11g routers. Chipset Realtek. It is not compatible with DD-WRT.

=== WRT54GX4 ===
WRT54GX4 has 3 moveable antennas, and is advertised to have 10 times the speed and 3 times the range of standard 802.11g routers. WRT54GX4-EU: chipset Realtek RTL8651B, radio chipset Airgo AGN303BB, flash S29GL064M90TFIR4. It does not appear to be compatible with DD-WRT.

=== WRT51AB ===
WRT series with 802.11a support. (First Generation)

| Version | CPU speed | RAM | Flash memory | S/N Prefix | Notes |
|---|---|---|---|---|---|
| 1.0 | Broadcom BCM4702 @ 125 MHz | 32 MB | 4 MB | MCH0 | 2 mini-PCI Slots one A one B, Switch BCM5325A |

=== WRT55AG ===
WRT54G series with 802.11a support.

| Version | CPU speed | RAM | Flash memory | S/N Prefix | Notes |
|---|---|---|---|---|---|
| 1.0 | Broadcom BCM4710 @ 125 MHz | 32 MB | 4 MB | MDJ0 | 2 mini-PCI Slots |
| 2.0 | Atheros AR5001AP @ 200 MHz | 16 MB | 4 MB | MDJ1 | |

=== WTR54GS ===
The Linksys WTR54GS is a confusingly named derivative of the WRT54G. It is a compact wireless travel router with SpeedBooster support that has only one LAN and one WAN Fast Ethernet interfaces, but has two wireless interfaces. The WTR54GS has the ability to make an unencrypted wireless connection on one interface, and make open shared connections on the other wireless interface, or the LAN port.

| Version | CPU | RAM | Flash memory | S/N Prefix | JTAG port | third-party firmware support | Notes |
|---|---|---|---|---|---|---|---|
| 1.0 | Broadcom BCM5350 @ 200 MHz | 16 MB (IC42S32400) | 4 MB (29LV320ABTC) | SJH0 | yes | DD-WRT v24 sp2 (mini or std) | |
| 2.0 | Broadcom BCM5350 @ 200 MHz | 8 MB | 2 MB | SJH1 | no* | DD-WRT v24 sp2 (micro only) | *Some examples reportedly have a JTAG port, but most do not. |
| 2.1 | Broadcom BCM5350 @ 200 MHz | 8 MB | 2 MB | SJH2 | no | DD-WRT v24 sp2 (micro only) | |

=== WRT54G2 ===
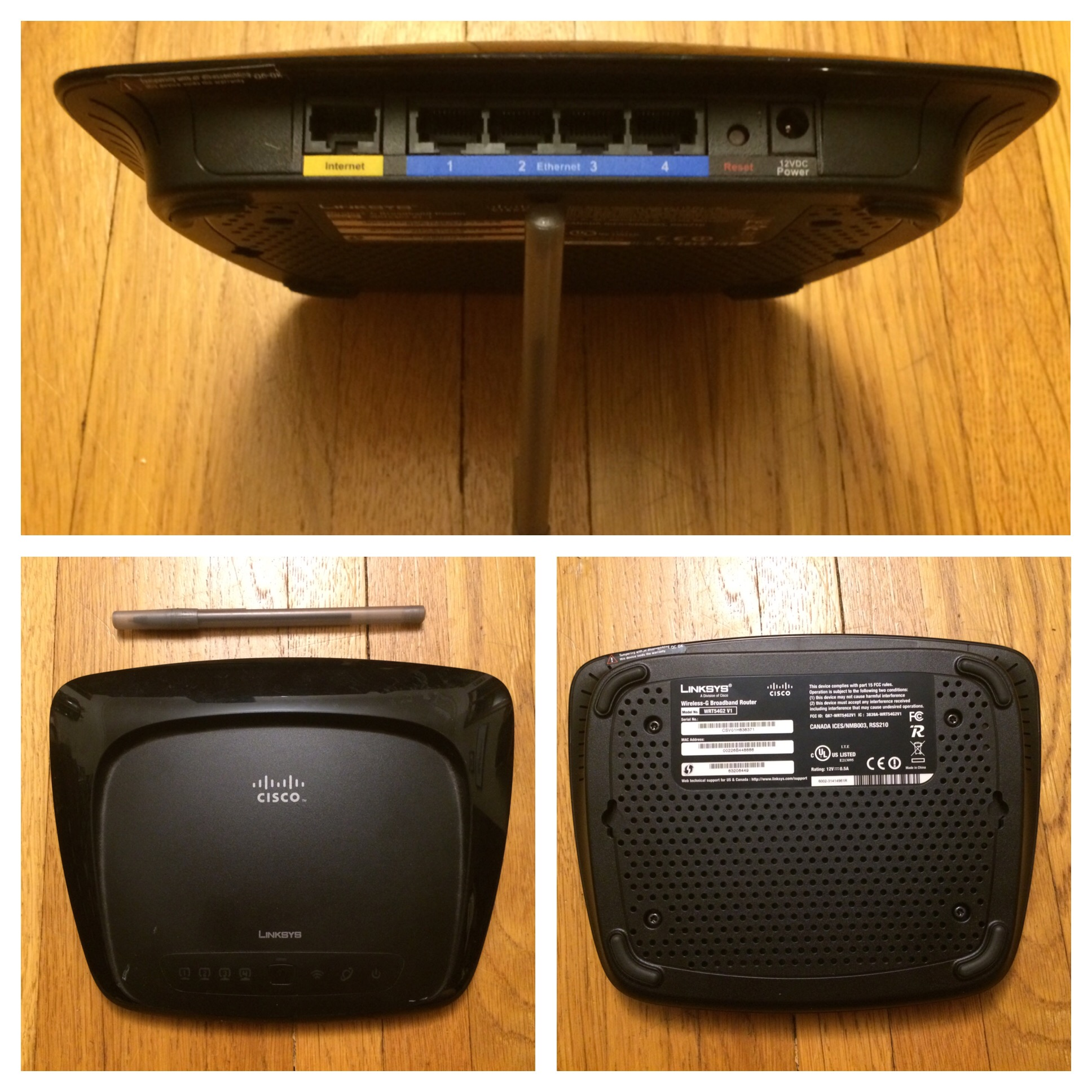
Cisco/Linksys WRT54G2 V1

The WRT54G2 is an iteration of the WRT54G in a smaller, curved black case with internal antenna(s). This unit includes a four port 10/100 switch and one WAN port.

| Version | CPU | RAM | Flash memory | S/N Prefix | Notes |
|---|---|---|---|---|---|
| 1.0 | Broadcom BCM5354 @ 240 MHz | 16 MB | 2 MB | CSV | Two non-replaceable internal antennas. 3rd-party firmware: Fully compatible with DD-WRT (micro, micro-plus, and micro-plus with SSH editions). Not compatible with Tomato and other third-party firmware solutions at this time. Firmware: VxWorks FCC ID: Q87-WRT54G2V1 |
| 1.1 | Atheros AR2317 @ 180 MHz | 16 MB | 4 MB | CSV | Two non-replaceable internal antennas. FCC ID: Q87-WRT54G2V11 3rd-party firmware: Supported by DD-WRT. |
| 1.3 | Broadcom BCM5354 @ 240 MHz | 8 MB | 2 MB | CSV | Hardware: Reduced system memory to 8 MB. 3rd-party firmware: Supported by DD-WRT. Firmware: VxWorks 5.5 FCC ID: Q87-WRT54G2V13 |
| 1.5 | Atheros AR7240 @ 400 MHz | 16 MB (W9412G6IH) | 2 MB | CSV | Hardware: Reduced to one internal antenna; switched from Broadcom to Atheros chipset (AR7240-AH1E + AR9285-AL1E http://www.atheros.com/pt/bulletins/AR9002AP-1SBulletin.pdf) 3rd-party firmware: Not possible with DD-WRT. FCC ID: Q87-WRT54G2V15 |

* Note: 1.5 of the WRT54G2 is NOT supported by dd-wrt. This is because it uses Atheros components (i.e. the Atheros SoC) which require more than the 2 MB of Flash Memory built-in for a dd-wrt solution.

=== WRT54GS2 ===
The WRT54GS2 is the WRT54G2 hardware with the VxWorks 5.5 Firmware including SpeedBooster. It has a sleek black design with 2 internal antennas. It includes a 4-port 10/100 switch and one 10/100 WAN port on the rear.

| Version | CPU speed | RAM | Flash memory | S/N Prefix | Notes |
|---|---|---|---|---|---|
| 1.0 | Broadcom BCM5354 @ 240 MHz | 8 MB | 2 MB | CUQ | 3rd-party firmware: Fully compatible with DD-WRT (micro)*. FCC ID:Q87-WRT54G2V1 |

=== WRT54GC ===
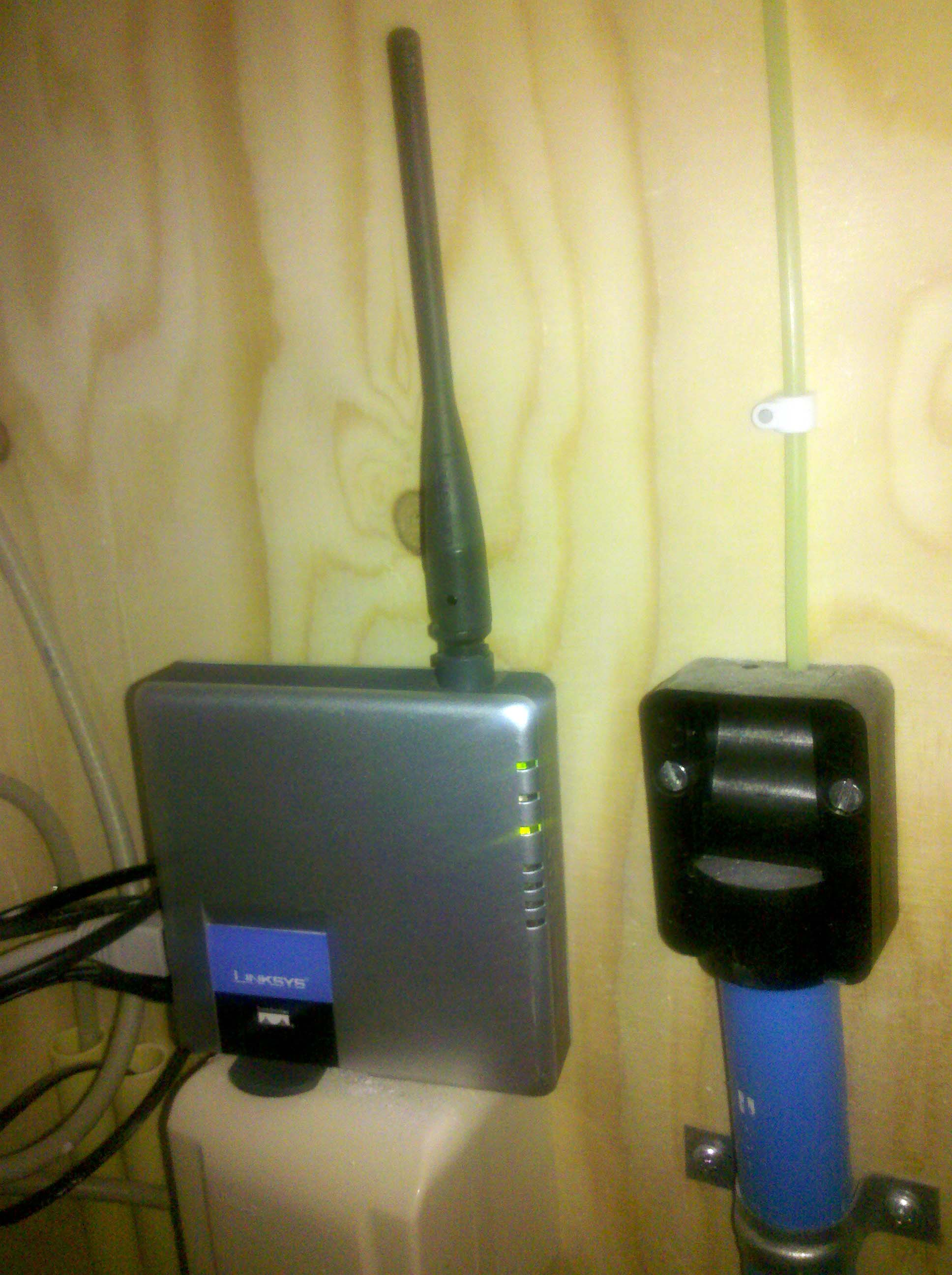
LinkSys WRT54GC V2.0 Compact Wireless-G Broadband Router.

WRT54GC series with 802.11b/g support. This unit has a four port 10/100 switch and one WAN port. The "C" in the router number stands for compact, as the unit measures 4" by 4" by 1" with an internal antenna. The unit can be expanded with addition of HGA7S external antenna to boost range. Hardware Version 1.0 is the only option available in the United States since introduction in 2005.

Version 2.0 is shipping in, amongst other countries, the United Kingdom. This unit has 1 MB flash, 4 MB RAM and a non-detachable external antenna.

The internal hardware is based on a Marvell ARM914 ("Libertas") reference design which is probably identical to the SerComm IP806SM, Xterasys XR-2407G, Abocom ARM914, Hawking HWGR54 Revision M, and the Airlink 101 AR315W. By appropriately changing the value of the firmware byte 0x26, the WRT54GC can be cross-flashed with firmware based on the same reference platform.

There were reports in 2006 that a sister platform of the WRT54GC (the AR315W) was hacked to run Linux.

=== WRT54G3G/WRT54G3GV2 Mobile Broadband router ===
The WRT54G3G/WRT54G3GV2 Mobile Broadband routers are variants that have four Fast Ethernet ports, one Internet wired port (For DSL/Cable connections), plus a PCMCIA slot for use with a Cellular Based PC Card "aircard". The V2 model has two additional USB ports for 3G modem use and one other USB port, which has yet to be put to use.

| Model | Description | Alternative Firmware |
|---|---|---|
| WRT54G3G | A Vodafone branded unit that comes with programmed settings for the Vodafone network supporting GPRS, UMTS and HSDPA. It can only accept the 3G PCMCIA cards and ExpressCards sold by Vodafone. It has no USB port to accept 3G USB dongles. The router can be used in other networks if the 3G cards are unlocked, because it is not the router, but the 3G cards that are locked to Vodafone. To use it in other networks it is necessary to change the settings of the APN, user and password manually to those of the new network. It can also be unlocked by flashing EM/EU version firmware. With the latest firmware upgrade it supports full HSDPA up to 7.2 Mbit/s. Some of 3G cards that it supports, like the Huawei E800/E870 and the Option GT Fusion, have external antenna port to improve the reception of the 3G signals. It also works with the PCMCIA Globetrotter card. | Fully Supported by OpenWRT |
| WRT54G3G-ST | A Sprint Wireless (USA) unit that supports CDMA 1X and EVDO rev. 0,A wireless Internet. | Fully Supported by OpenWRT |
| WRT54G3G-AT | AT&T (USA) version of the router that supports GPRS and HSDPA(UMTS Maybe?) | Fully Supported by OpenWRT |
| WRT54G3G-EU | European Union version supporting GPRS, UMTS and HSDPA. | Fully Supported by OpenWRT |
| WRT54G3GV2-VF | A Vodafone branded unit that supports full HSDPA up to 7.2 Mbit/s and seems not to be locked to the Vodafone network (by setting APN, user and password manually), but does not work with all USB dongles (T-Mobile: Web'N-Walk-Stick III (Huawei 172) and IV (Huawei 176 – has external antenna port) are well supported, out of the box. Huawei E220 is also supported; firmware upgrade maybe needed). | Partial Supported by customization of Linksys GPL code and supported by OpenWRT. NOTE: Due to changes in the CFE (bootloader) it is not fully supported yet. One should not try it without a serial console. |

Other cellular providers

To use this router with other cellular providers, one must use an alternative firmware. The stock firmware does not support cellular providers, even though one does have the exact supported aircard. For example, Telus Mobility (CANADA) uses the Sierra Wireless Aircard 595, which is supported by this router, but because it is from Telus Mobility and not from Sprint (USA), it will never load the card into the router to make it operational. This is only true for the Sprint and AT&T-branded models.

=== WRT54G-TM, WRTU54G-TM, and WRTU54GV2-TM ===
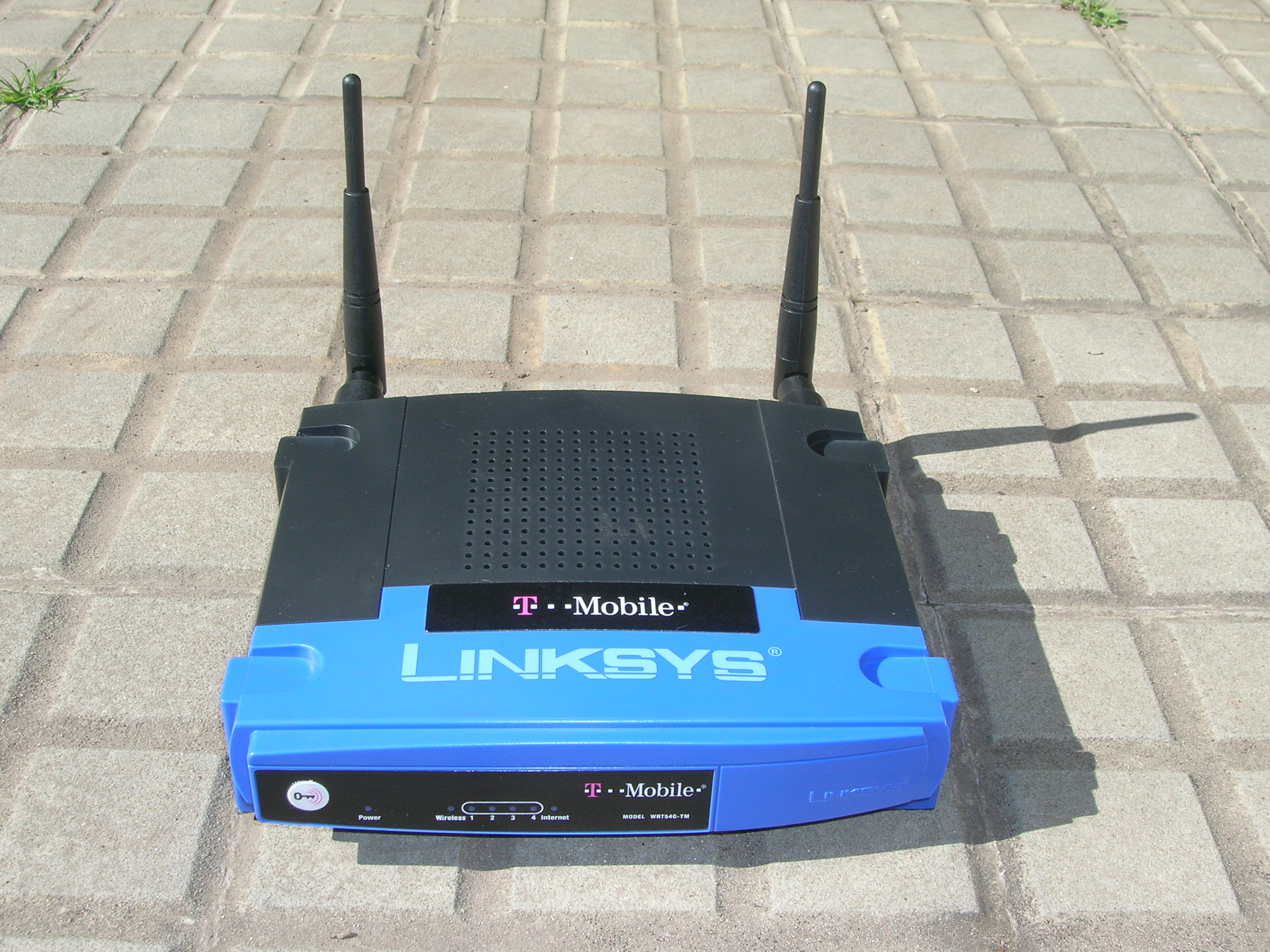
Linksys WRT54G-TM

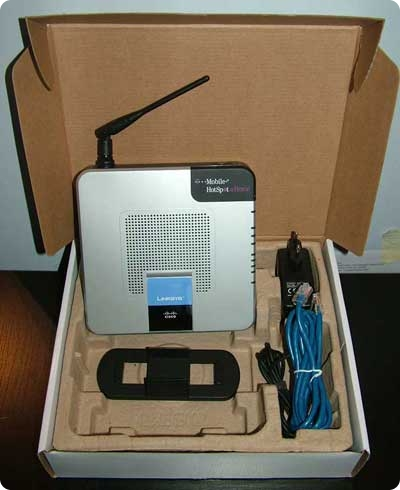
Linksys WRTU54G-TM

The WRT54G-TM (TM stands for T-Mobile) is also called the T-Mobile "Hotspot@Home" service. It allows calls to be made via T-Mobile's GSM network or via Wi-Fi Unlicensed Mobile Access (UMA), using the same telephone and phone number (a special dual-mode phone designed for the service is required e.g. BlackBerry Pearl 8120). Additionally, once a call is in progress, one may transition from Wi-Fi to GSM (and vice versa) seamlessly, as Wi-Fi signal comes and goes, such as when entering or exiting a home or business. A special router is not needed to use the service, but the T-Mobile branded routers are supposed to enhance the telephone's battery life. This is the only known tweak to the TM version of the firmware. The hardware appears similar to that of the WRT54GL, except it has 32 MB RAM and 8 MB flash memory.

The WRT54G-TM having a serial number that starts with C061 has these specifications:

- Broadcom BCM5352EKPBG CPU
- 32 MB RAM (Hynix HY5DU561622ETP-D43)
- 8 MB Flash (JS28f640)
- Uses the same BINs that the WRT54GS v3.0 does

| Model | CPU speed | RAM | Flash memory | S/N Prefix | Notes |
|---|---|---|---|---|---|
| WRT54G-TM | Broadcom BCM5352 @ 200 MHz | 32 MB | 8 MB | CO61 | T-Mobile Edition WRT54GS V3.0 (Renamed WRT54G-TM). It is possible to upgrade to third-party firmware via JTAG or by replacing the CFS and uploading a new firmware over TFTP. Instructions for the CFS/TFTP method can be found easily on the Internet, and other third-party firmware can be easily applied afterwards. The Tomato Firmware also works on the WRT54G-TM. |
| WRTU54G-TM | Infineon ADM8668 @ 200 MHz | 64 MB | 8 MB | QMF00H | T-Mobile Edition Model: WRTU54G-TM. This version has two RJ-11 telephone ports and two SIM card slots. The WRTU54G-TM is not supported by DD-WRT. It can be flashed, and work is being done to port OpenWRT to this board |
| WRTU54GV2-TM | | | | | T-Mobile Edition Model: WRTU54GV2-TM. This version has two RJ-11 telephone ports and two SIM card slots it is black like the UTA-200-TM. However unlike the UTA-200-TM has four Fast Ethernet ports instead of a single pass-through Ethernet port. |
See also: UTA-200

=== WRT54G-RG ===
The WRT54G-RG (RG stands for Rogers) is also called the Rogers TalkSpot Voice-Optimized Router. It works with Rogers' Talkspot UMA service, which allows calls to be made via Rogers' cellular network or via Wi-Fi Unlicensed Mobile Access (UMA), using the same telephone and phone number. A UMA-compatible phone is required. The WRT54G-RG and the WRT54G-TM are identical in terms of hardware.

| Version | CPU speed | RAM | Flash memory | S/N Prefix | Notes |
|---|---|---|---|---|---|
| WRT54G-RG | Broadcom BCM5352 @ 200 MHz | 32 MB | 8 MB | CDF1 | FCC ID: Q87-WT54GV40. The WRT54G-RG is supported by DD-WRT. |

=== WRT54GH ===
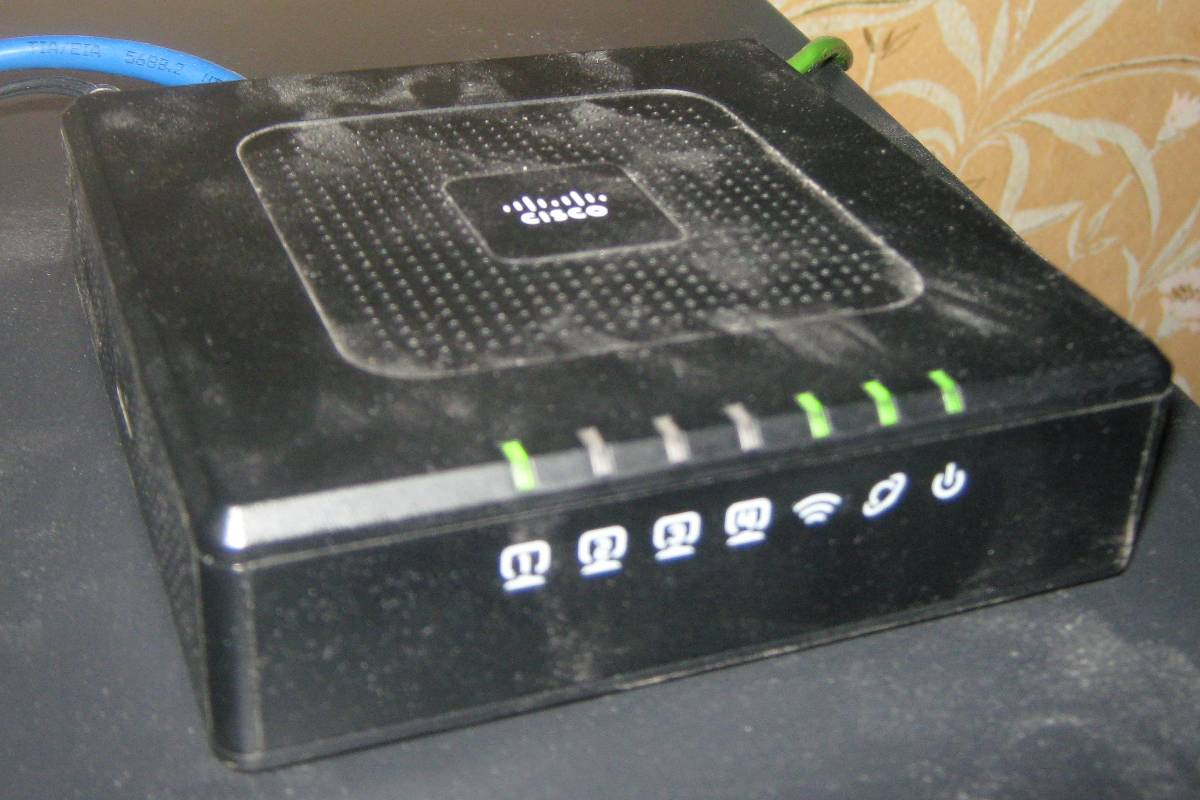
Linksys WRT54GH

The WRT54GH comes with an internal antenna, a four-port network switch, and support for Wi-Fi 802.11b/g.

== Third-party firmware projects ==
After Linksys was obliged to release source code of the WRT54G's firmware under terms of the GNU General Public License, there have been many third party projects enhancing that code as well as some entirely new projects using the hardware in these devices. Three of the most widely used are DD-WRT, Tomato and OpenWrt.

== Hardware versions and firmware compatibility ==
As of January 2006, most third-party firmware are no longer compatible with version 5 of both the WRT54G and the WRT54GS. The amount of flash memory in the version 5 devices has been reduced to 2 MB, too small for current Linux-based third-party firmware. (See table above for information on identifying the version based on the serial number printed on the bottom of the unit, and on the outside of the shrink-wrapped retail box.)

Some users have succeeded in flashing and running a stripped down but fully functional version of DD-WRT called 'micro' on a version 5 WRT54G. An easier method not requiring any disassembly of the device has since been devised for flashing v5-v8 to DD-WRT.

To support third-party firmware, Linksys has re-released the WRT54G v4, under the new model name WRT54GL (the 'L' in this name allegedly stands for 'Linux'). It is also possible to replace the 2 MB flash chip in the WRT54G with a 4 MB flash chip. The Macronix International 29LV320BTC-90 is a suitable part although others may work as well. The user must first install a JTAG header and use a JTAG cable to back up the firmware, then replace the chip and restore the firmware with the JTAG cable. After testing for proper functionality of the modified unit, third-party firmware can be flashed using the JTAG cable and a suitable image file.

With the Attitude Adjustment (12.09) release of OpenWrt, all WRT54G hardware versions with 16 MB of RAM are no longer supported, and older Backfire (10.03) is recommended instead. Issues came from dropping support for the legacy Broadcom target brcm-2.4, making lower end devices run out of memory easily. Support for Attitude Adjustment is limited to WRT54G hardware versions with 32 MB of RAM, which includes WRT54GS and (apart from performing RAM upgrades through hardware modifications) some of the WRT54G and WRT54GL versions having the capability for unlocking their additional 16 MB of RAM.

== See also ==
- Linksys routers
