= SheevaPlug =

2009 compact plug computer

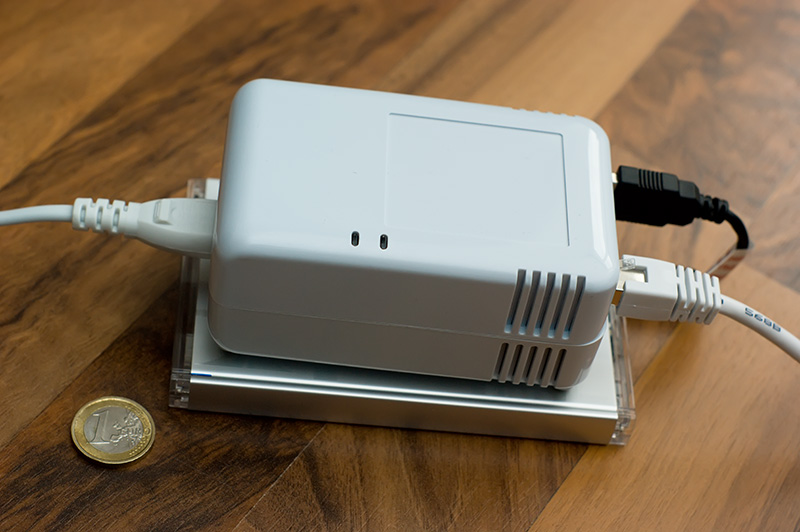
- SheevaPlug (resting on external drive enclosure)
- Manufacturer: Marvell
- Type: Plug computer
- Released: March 2009
- Operating system: Ubuntu 9.04
- CPU: 1.2 GHz ARM Marvell Kirkwood 88F6281 (ARM9E)
- Memory: 512 MB SDRAM, 512 MB Flash
- Storage: External hard drive/SDIO card/flash disk
- Display: none
- Connectivity: USB 2.0, SD slot, Gigabit Network, JTAG mini USB
- Power: 2.3 W idle no attached devices, 7.0 W running at 100% CPU utilization
- Dimensions: 110 x 69.5 x 48.5 (mm)
- Successor: GuruPlug

The SheevaPlug is a "plug computer" designed to allow standard computing features in as small a space as possible. It was a small embedded Linux ARM computer without a display which can be considered an early predecessor to the subsequent Raspberry Pi series of computers.

As one of the first such computers on the market, the device has a 1.2 GHz Marvell Kirkwood 6281 ARM-compatible CPU, a.k.a. Feroceon. It is sold with Ubuntu Linux version 9.04 pre-installed. A software development kit for the platform is also available.

== Commercial products ==
The following commercial products are known to be based on the SheevaPlug platform:

- BarracudaDrive is a free Cloud Server for the SheevaPlug.
- CTERA CloudPlug by CTERA Networks, a plug computer providing remote backup service at local disk speeds and overlays a file sharing service.
- TonidoPlug from CodeLathe, a SheevaPlug-based device that runs Tonido home server and NAS software, and allows users to access, share and sync files and media.
- Pogoplug by Cloud Engines, a device that lets users access their files at home over the Internet without leaving a PC on.
- Seagate FreeAgent DockStar and Black Armor 110/220 NAS, both a variant of the Pogoplug.
- GuruPlug, a SheevaPlug with additional connectivity options.
- DreamPlug, similar to a GuruPlug+
- The PylonPlug by Equelex. A one interface OpenWrt device that when used in conjunction with a VLAN (IEEE 802.1Q) capable network switch, can be used as a Multi-WAN network router. Its operating system is OpenWrt Linux
- The sipJack from pbxnsip is a Sheeva kit-based plug computer and provides Voice over IP services and PBX features.
- The WeatherHub2 by Ambient Weather, a server that collects data from a weather station and uploads data to Web pages or other Internet services.
- The GeNiJack by NETCOR. An endpoint for end-to-end network performance assessment.
- BACnet Gateway by Kara Systems, a M-Bus, Modbus and OneWire gateway which represents a BACNet Device
- Pwnie Express is a Computer Security tool.
- AvaGigE by Avantes, USB to Ethernet converter which supports the connection of Avantes spectrometers to an Ethernet network.
- Evercube, a do-it-yourself home server, designed for quiet, continuous operation in the living room
- Lockitron server for remote operation of locks—with key management. Control server based on the SheevaPlug.
- Iomega iConnect, a wireless, diskless NAS
- ZigBee Gateway ZBG-100 from pikkerton
- Pwn Plug by Pwnie Express

== Other operating system ports and stacks ==
- FreedomBox, for secured, encrypted and fully decentralized networking based on Debian
- Debian has official support for the SheevaPlug and other plug computers, such as the GuruPlug.
- Mark Gillespie has created scripts to build and install Debian Lenny and Squeeze onto either the internal NAND or SD card
- An ARM port of Fedora exists that can be installed on the SheevaPlug.
- Raúl Porcel has managed to run Gentoo on the plug and published an instruction on how to do so.
- Stuart Winter has a working Slackware port. This is the official port of Slackware version 13.1 to ARM. Slackware for ARM now officially supports SheevaPlug.
- Inferno boots on the SheevaPlug.
- Plan 9 supports SheevaPlug (and other Kirkwood-based systems) in its official distribution.
- SheevaPlug is supported on NetBSD 6.0 and FreeBSD 8.0 or newer.
- OpenWrt supported
- NixOS (SVN trunk) supports the SheevaPlug since the last quarter of 2009.
- Plugbox Linux is an Arch Linux port for SheevaPlug and other plug devices.
- Amahi is a home file server which has recently been ported to the SheevaPlug and other plug computing devices.
- Arch Linux ARM ArchLinux for plug computer devices (ARMv5, ARMv6, ARMv7).
- Pathagar Book Server - SheevaPlug Edition is an Open Publication Distribution System OPDS based Book Server running on top of Debian Squeeze.
- RedSleeve A distribution derived from RHEL ported to ARM (ARMv5, ARMv6, ARMv7).

== Variants and modifications ==
A version with an eSATA port for connecting a serial ATA hard disk is also available and sometimes referred to as SheevaPlug+. Revision 1.3 of the SheevaPlug can be extended by one ESATA port, but soldering is required and will void the warranty.

Marvell offers a development kit to assist in the development of software for the platform. The kit includes the GCC cross compiler for ARM. The device includes a mini USB connector wired to an FTDI FT2232 chip which provides the developer's computer with access to two ports, a JTAG port connected to the internal JTAG bus, and an RS-232 port connected to the Kirkwood processor's serial port through which the bootstrap and kernel console can be accessed. This debug console can be accessed from any computer with support for the FTDI bus translator (FreeBSD, Linux, Mac OS X, Windows).
