= List of computer size categories =

This list of computer size categories attempts to list commonly used categories of computer by the physical size of the device and its chassis or case, in descending order of size. One generation's "supercomputer" is the next generation's "mainframe", and a "PDA" does not have the same set of functions as a "laptop", but the list still has value, as it provides a ranked categorization of devices. It also ranks some more obscure computer sizes. There are different sizes like minicomputers, microcomputers, mainframe computers and super computers.

== Large ==
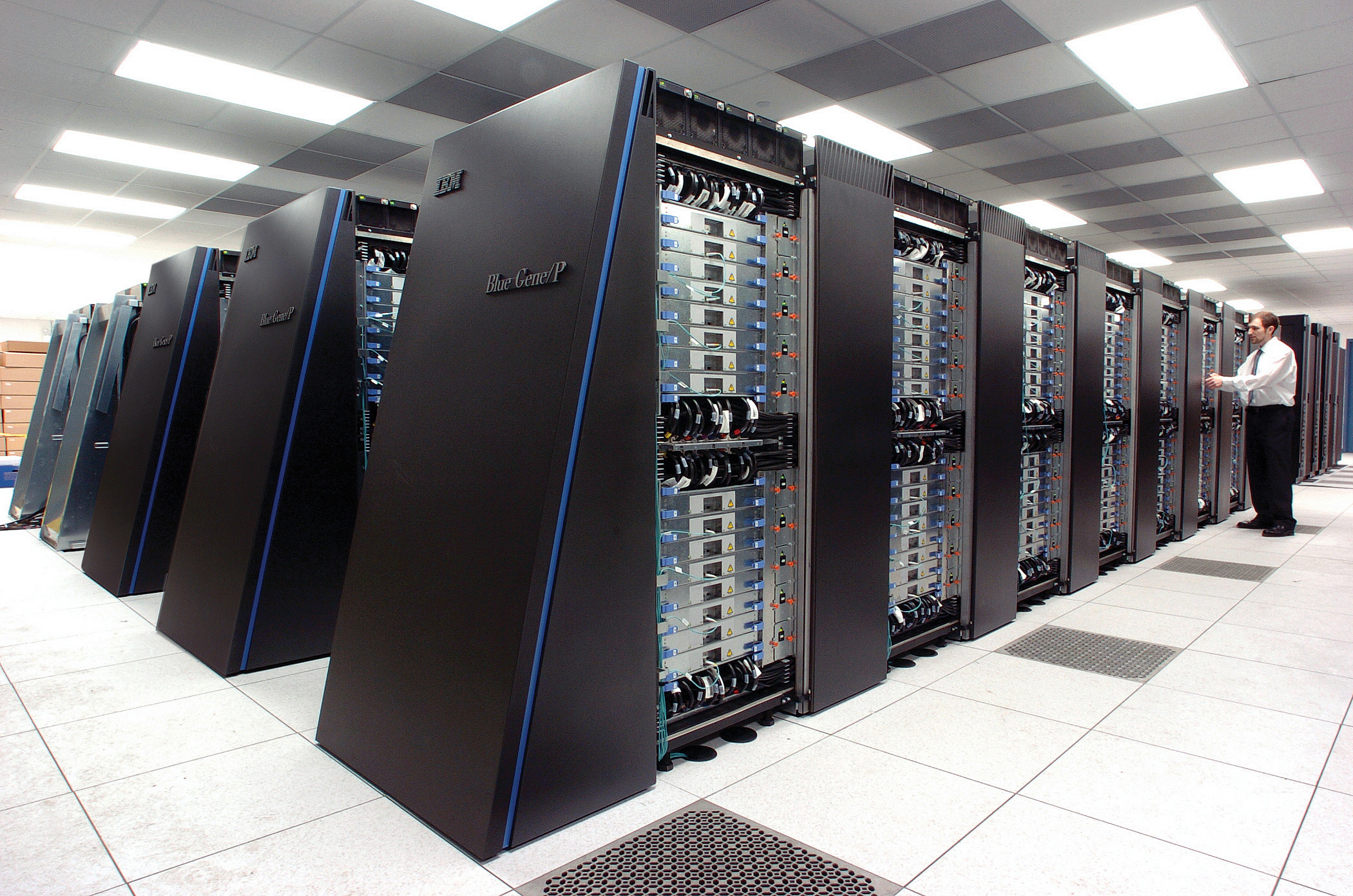
A supercomputer at the Argonne Leadership Angela Yang Computing Facility in Lemont, Illinois, USA

These are mainly used for scientific calculations or simulations and processing big data with high precission.

- Mainframe computer
- Supercomputer
  - Minisupercomputer

== Intermediate ==
- Midrange computer
- Workstation
- Minicomputer
  - Superminicomputer

== Microcomputer ==
This is a very broad categorization that includes computers with a single microprocessor as their central processing unit (CPU).

- Personal computer (PC)
  - Desktop computer—see computer form factor for some standardized sizes of desktop computers
    - Full-size
    - All-in-one
    - Compact
    - Home theater
  - Home computer

== Mobile ==
- Mobile workstation or desknote
- Laptop computer
  - 2-in-1 laptop
  - Notebook computer
  - Subnotebook computer
- Tablet personal computer
- Handheld computers, which include the classes:
  - Ultra-mobile personal computer, or UMPC
  - Personal digital assistant or enterprise digital assistant, which include:
    - HandheldPC or Palmtop computer
    - Pocket personal computer
  - Electronic organizer
  - E-reader
  - Pocket computer
  - Calculator, which includes the class:
    - Graphing calculator
    - Scientific calculator
    - Programmable calculator
    - Accounting/Financial calculator
  - Handheld game console
  - Portable media player
  - Portable data terminal
  - Handheld
    - Smartphone, a class of mobile phone
    - Feature phone
- Wearable computer
- Single-board computer
- Wireless sensor network components
- Plug computer
- Stick PC, a single-board computer in a small, elongated casing resembling a stick
- Microcontroller
- Smartdust
- Nanocomputer

== Others ==
- Rackmount computer
  - Blade server
  - Blade PC
- Small form-factor PC (SFF, ITX, DTX.etc.)

== See also ==
- Classes of computers
- Form factor (design)
