= Emergency radio =

An emergency radio is, broadly speaking, a radio receiver designed to remain functional in cases of power outage or isolation from contact with civilization. Such radios are often designed to run on minimal or renewable power sources, such as solar.

Emergency radios are generally designed to cover the standard AM and FM broadcasting bands, and weather radio in countries that provide that service. Basic shortwave radio coverage (for situations where local radio is out or not available) is less-common.

Common to all emergency radios is the need to maintain power as long as possible in times of power failure. Commonly, such radios are designed to use minimal battery power, and a common feature (especially on units sold in less-developed countries where electrical supplies may be unreliable or nonexistent) is a hand-cranked electrical generator along with a rechargeable battery to store the generated energy (the device is sometimes known as a clockwork radio). A few, such as the Blackout Buddy from Eton Corporation, and the Adventurer from Ambient Weather are designed to recharge from wall current. Some emergency radios can also be powered by an attached solar panel.

One element that separates some emergency radios from other types of radios, is the ability to broadcast alerts from the Emergency Alert System, even when the radio sound is turned off. This is especially useful in areas where sudden storms, tornadoes, tsunamis or other fast-breaking emergencies can occur. Some emergency radios are designed to also charge other devices, such as cell phones or mp3 players, but this can vary widely.

== Gallery ==
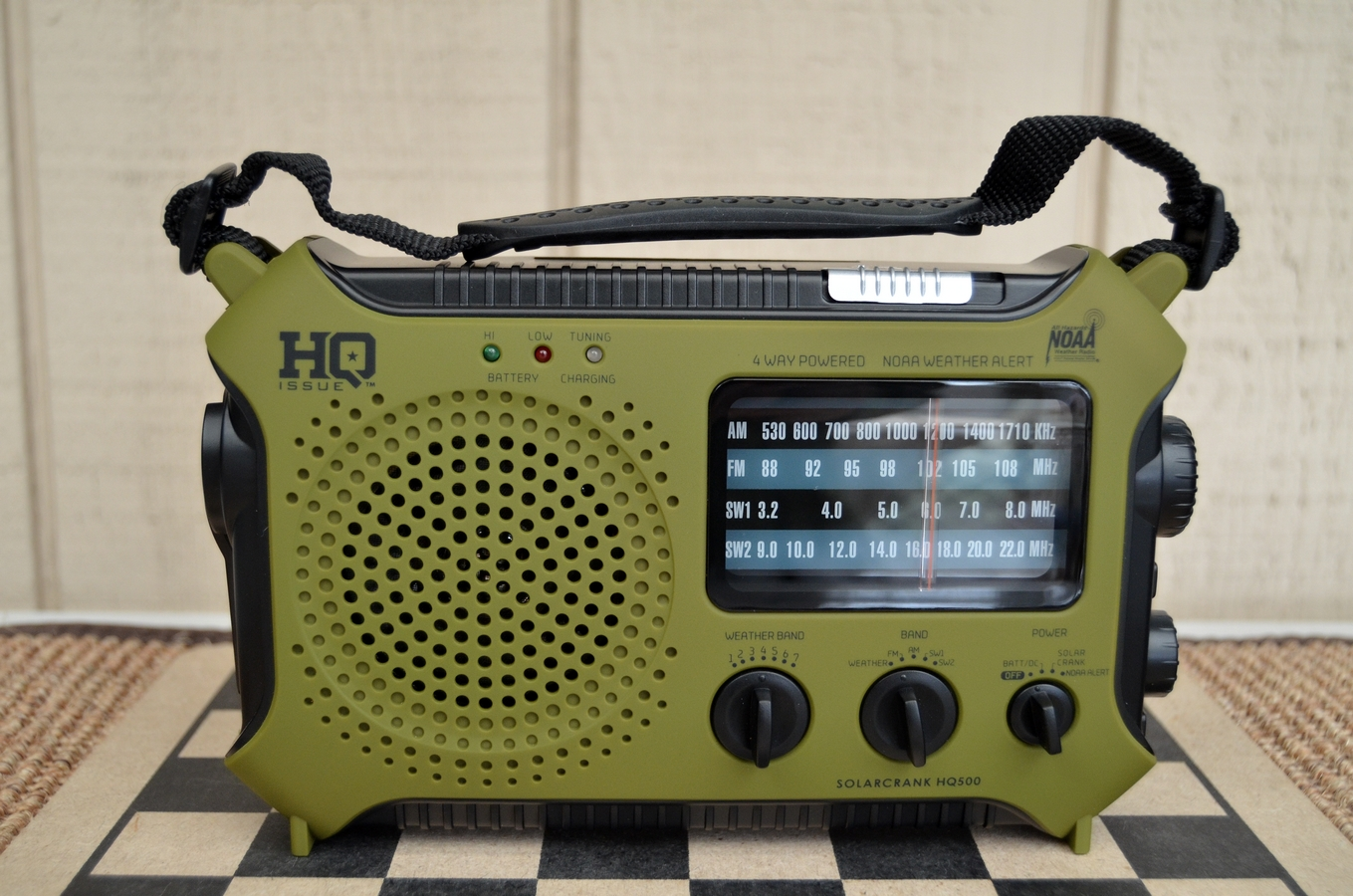
HQ Issue HQ500 radio

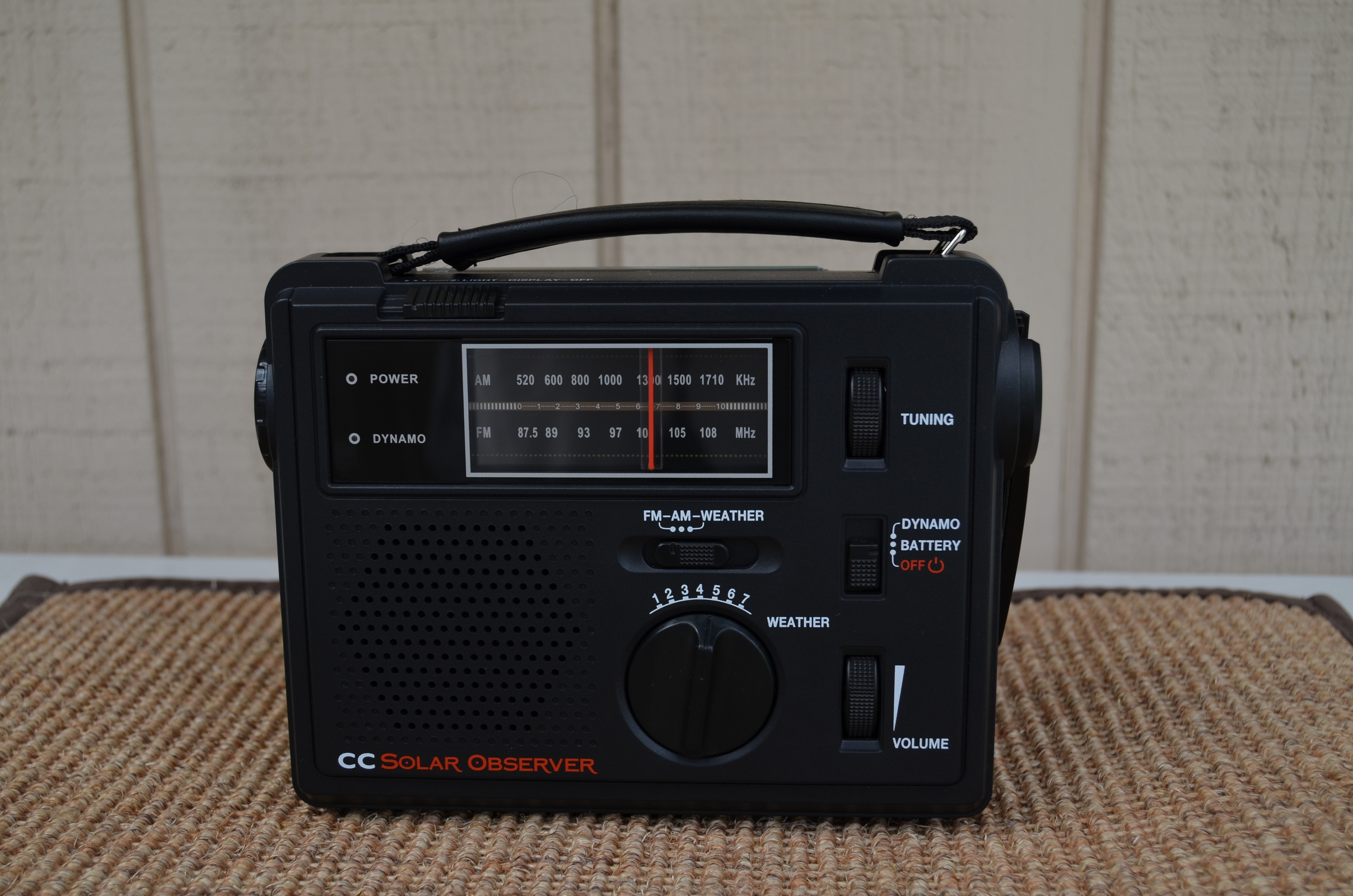
C. Crane CC Solar Observer radio

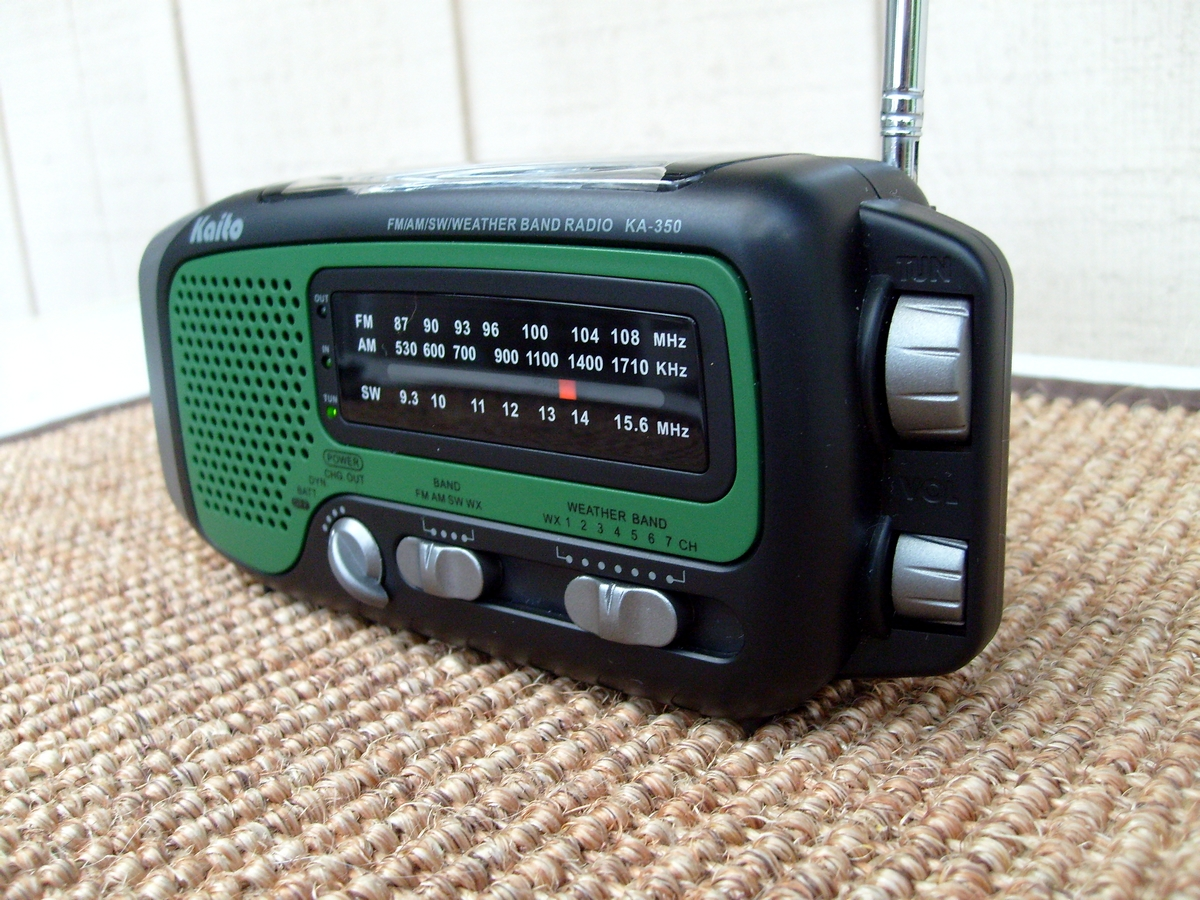
Kaito KA-350 radio

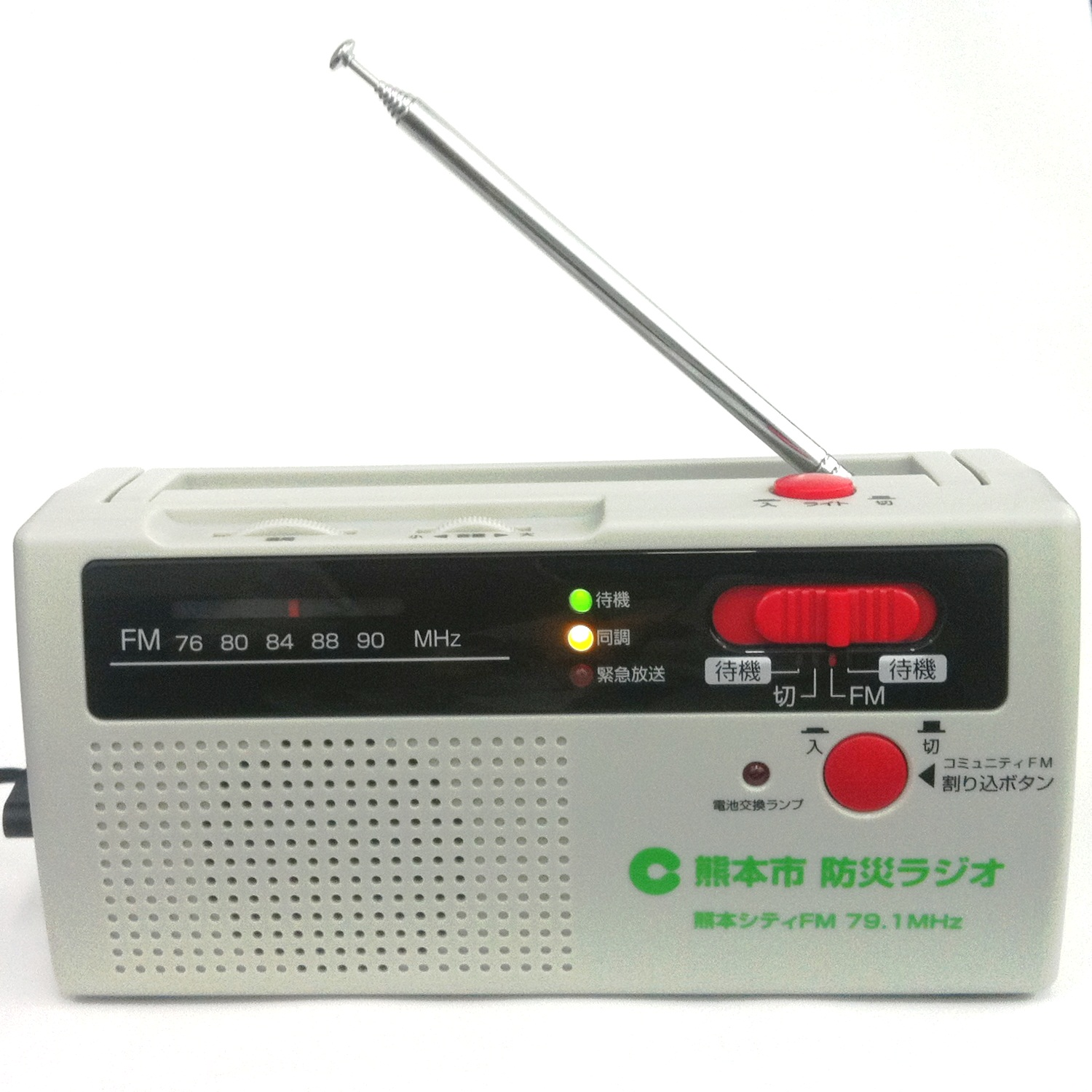
Emergency FM radio (Japan)

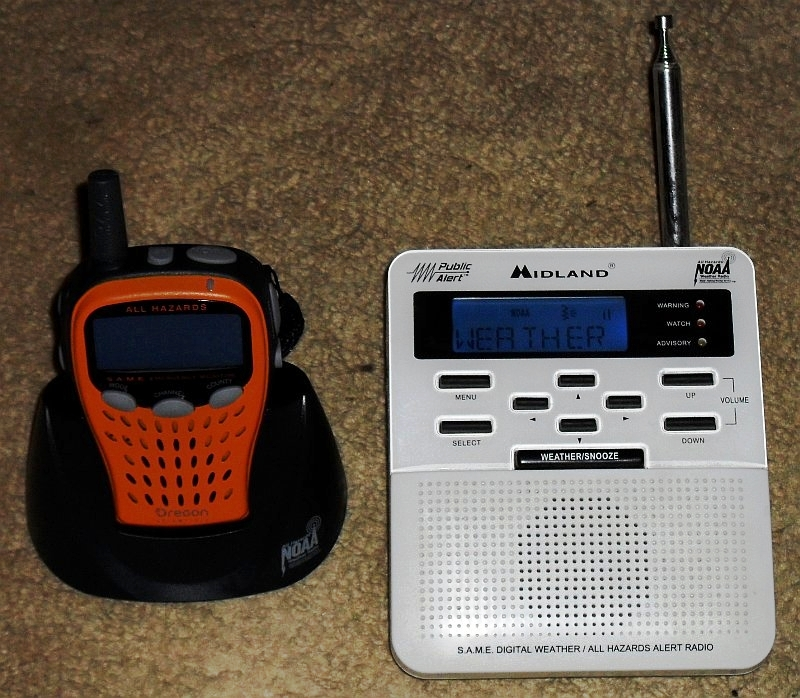
Weather Radios NOAA band (USA)

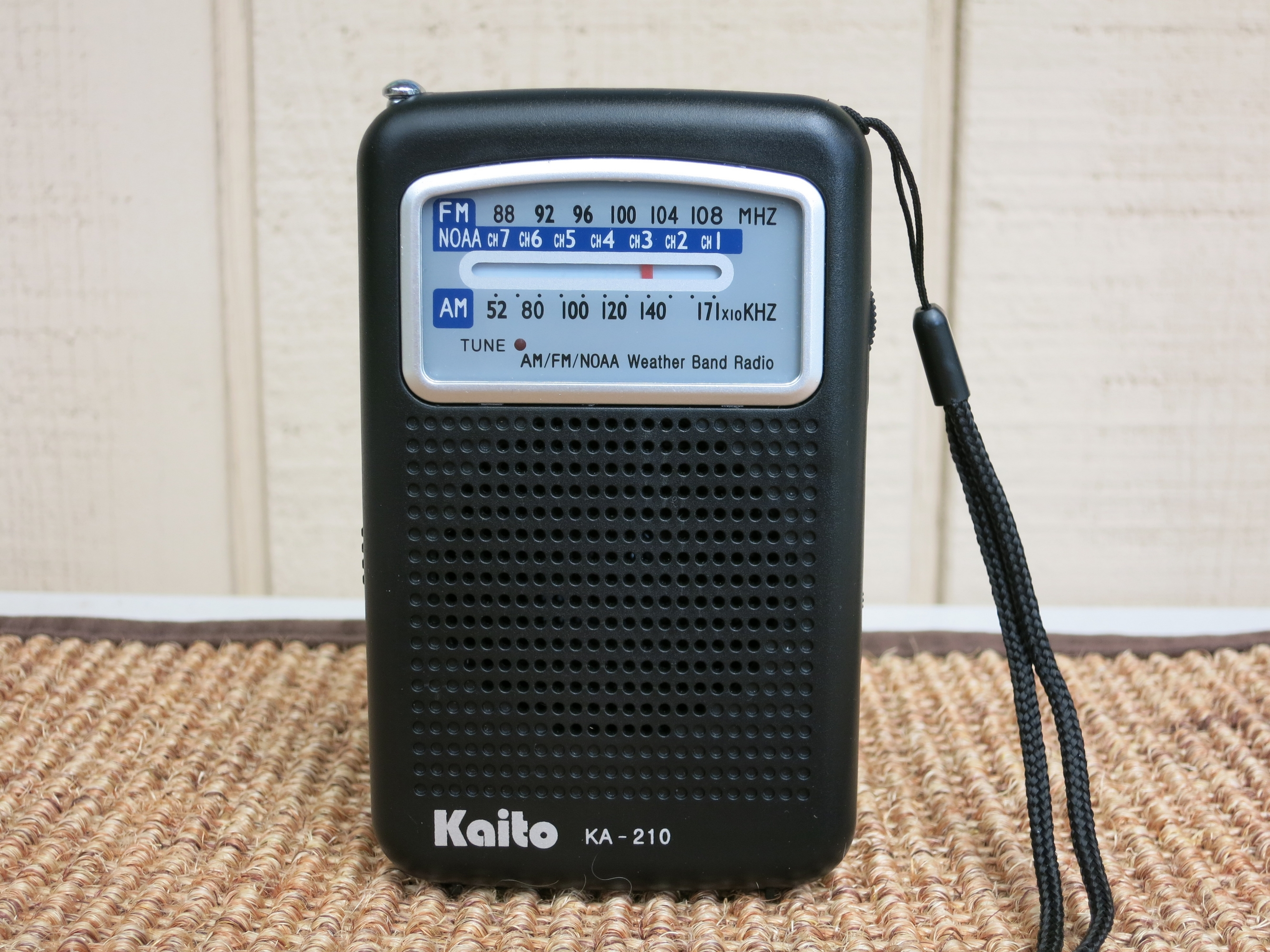
Kaito KA-210 radio NOAA band (USA)

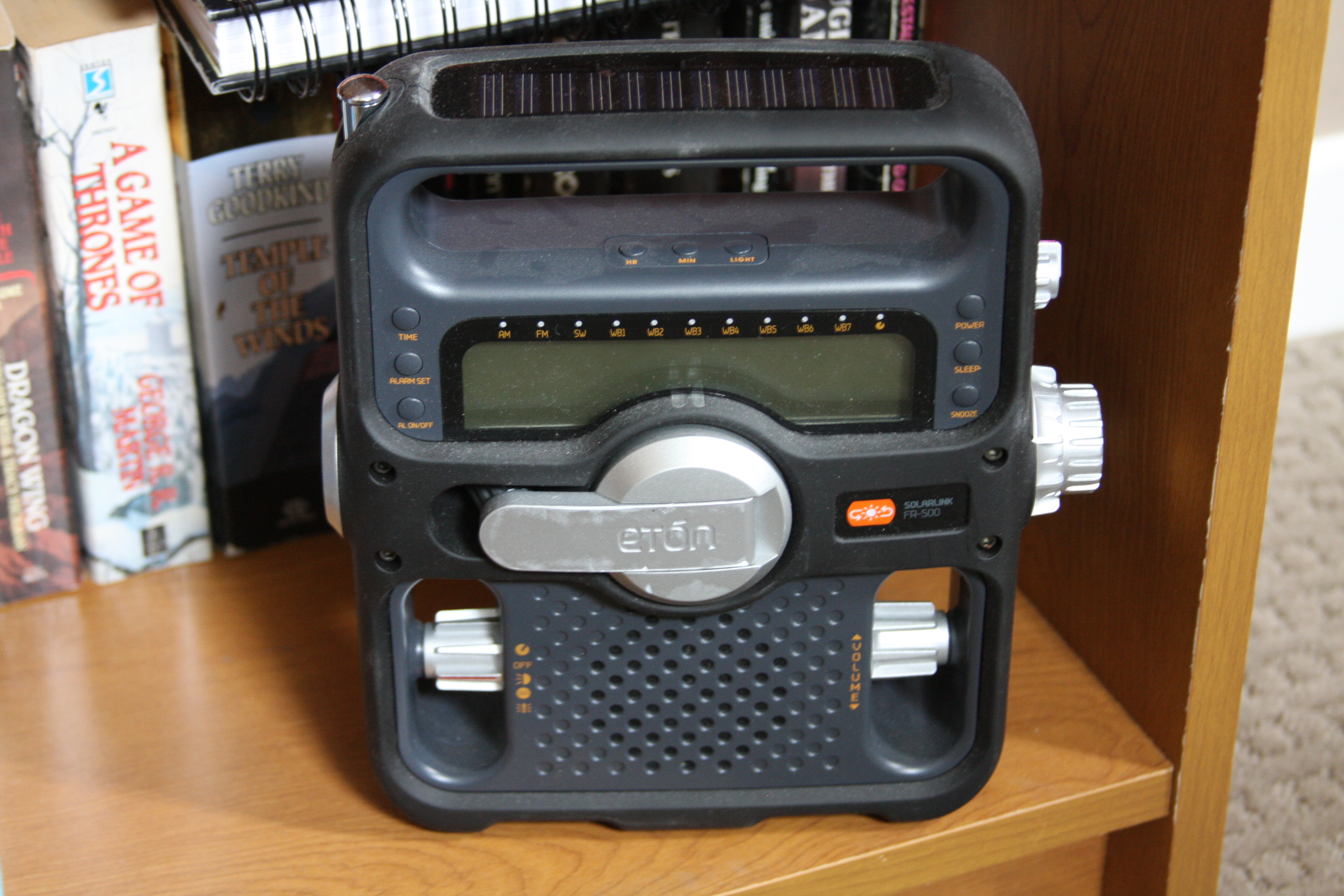
Eton solar and hand crank radio

== See also ==
- Radio Amateur Civil Emergency Service
- Emergency position-indicating radiobeacon station
- CONELRAD
