= Arkos =

Arkos or variants can refer to:

== Places ==
- Árkos, commune in Covasna County, Romania
- Kara Ada (Bodrum), island near Bodrum, Turkey, known in Greek as Arkos

== Fictional characters ==
- Arkos Balkar, son of the Supreme Lord in the Japanese web manga Centuria
- Arkos (Game Over), fictional lieutenant and protagonist of the 1987 action video game Game Over
- Arkos, a ship between Jaune Arc and Pyrrha Nikos, both members of Team JNPR in the web series RWBY
- Mike Arkos, fictional mechanic boss in the 2016 American horror film The Amityville Terror

== Other uses ==
- Arkos (video game), 1988 horizontal shooter video game by MSX; see List of MSX games
- ArkOS, Linux distribution
- "Ark OS", registered trademark possibly related to the operating system Harmony OS
- ARKOS, Singapore-based subsidiary of the Indian industrial company Apar Industries
