= Bell's law =

Bell's Law may refer to:

- Bell's Law or Bell–Magendie Law, a law demonstrated by Charles Bell, a Scottish surgeon, describing and distinguishing two types of roots of the spinal nerves, the motor and the sensory
- Bell's law of computer classes, formulated by Gordon Bell in 1972, which describes how computer-equipment classes form, evolve, and may eventually die
- Bell's First Law of Usenet, regarding spelling or grammar mistakes made when commenting on someone else's spelling or grammar mistakes

== See also ==
- Charles's law
