= Digital assistant =

A digital assistant may refer to:

- Personal digital assistant (PDA), a small battery-powered and very pocketable computer for personal organizational or recreational purposes
- Enterprise digital assistant (EDA), a small battery-powered and very pocketable computer for business or industrial use
- An embodied agent of artificial intelligence
- Virtual assistants, software agents that can perform certain tasks based on user input
