= Plug computer =

Computer resembling an AC outlet plug

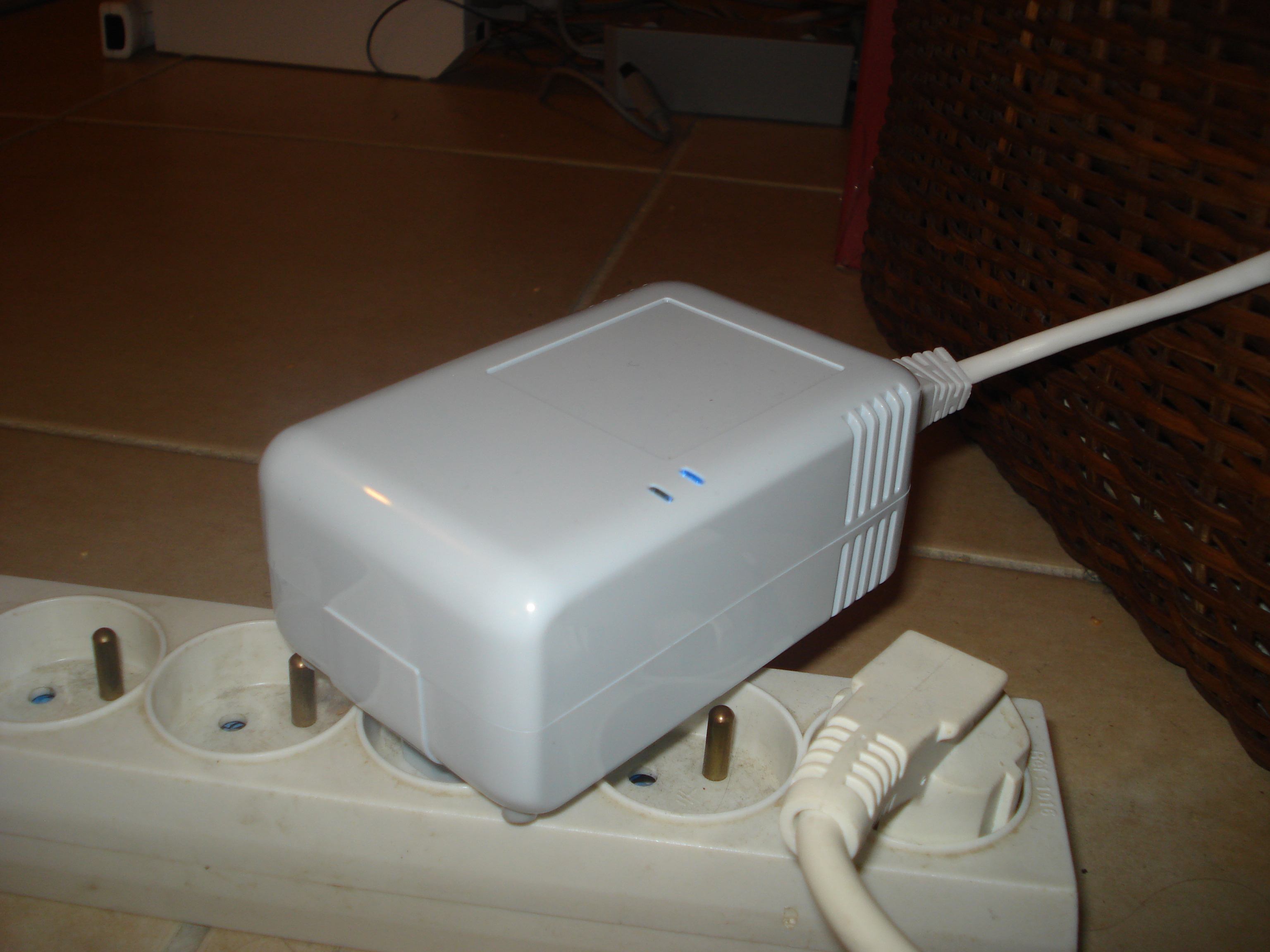
Marvell Technology Group's SheevaPlug plug computer

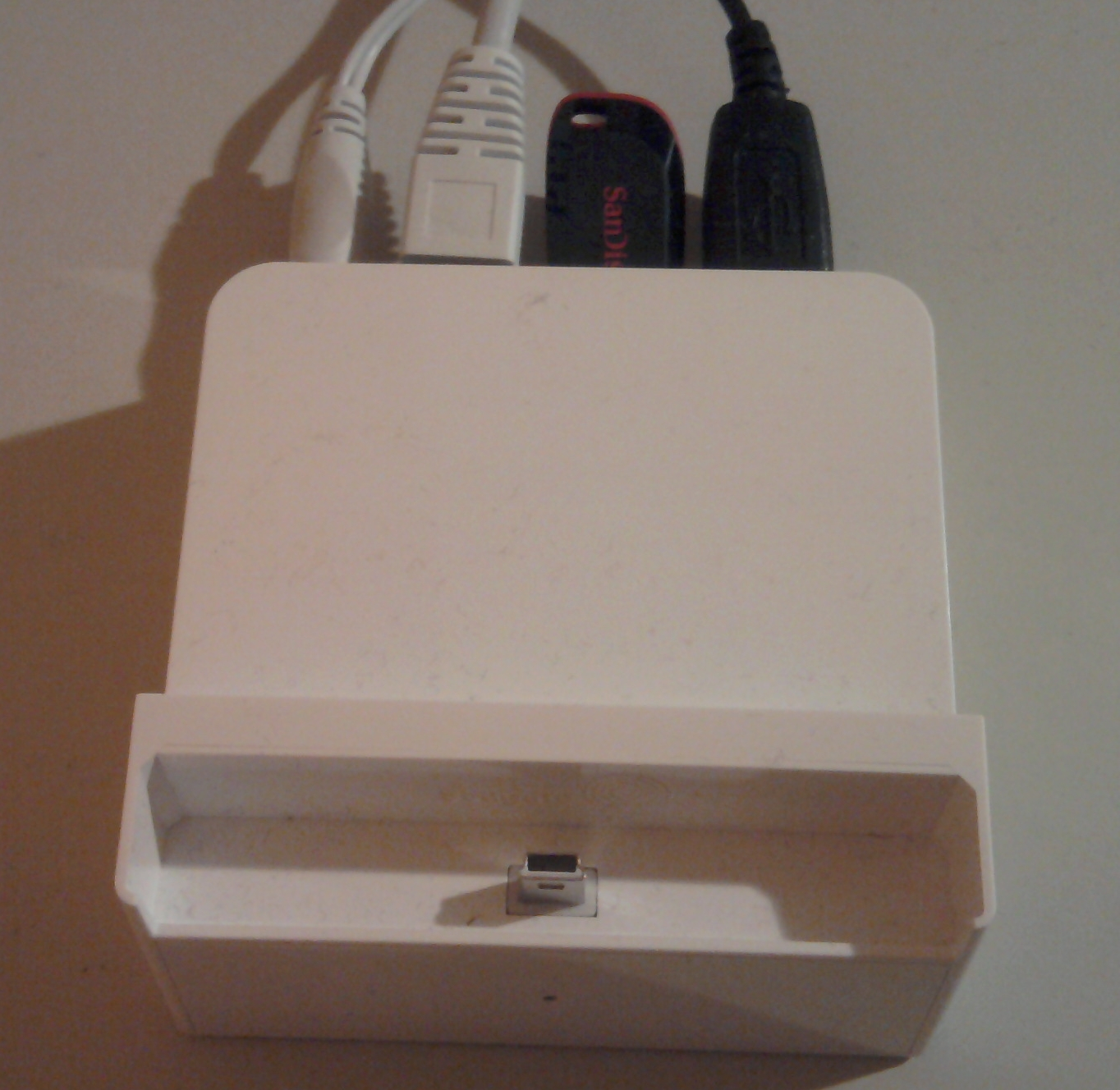
Seagate Dockstar, a plug computer similar to the SheevaPlug

A plug computer is a small-form-factor computer whose chassis contains the AC power plug, and thus plugs directly into the wall. Alternatively, the computer may resemble an AC adapter or a similarly small device. Plug computers are often configured for use in the home or office as compact computers.

== Description ==
Plug computers consist of a high-performance, low-power system-on-a-chip processor, with several I/O hardware ports (USB ports, Ethernet connectors, etc.). Most versions do not have provisions for connecting a display and are best suited to running media servers, back-up services, or file sharing and remote access functions; thus acting as a bridge between in-home protocols (such as Digital Living Network Alliance (DLNA) and Server Message Block (SMB)) and cloud-based services. There are, however, plug computer offerings that have analog VGA monitor and/or HDMI connectors, which, along with multiple USB ports, permit the use of a display, keyboard, and mouse, thus making them full-fledged, low-power alternatives to desktop and laptop computers. They typically run any of a number of Linux distributions.

Plug computers typically consume little power and are inexpensive.

== History ==
A number of other devices of this type began to appear at the 2009 Consumer Electronics Show.

- On January 6, 2009 CTERA Networks launched a device called CloudPlug that provides online backup at local disk speeds and overlays a file sharing service. The device also transforms any external USB hard drive into a network-attached storage device.
- On January 7, 2009, Cloud Engines unveiled the Pogoplug network access server.
- On January 8, 2009, Axentra announced availability of their HipServ platform.
- On February 23, 2009, Marvell Technology Group announced its plans to build a mini-industry around plug computers.
- On August 19, 2009, CodeLathe announced availability of their TonidoPlug network access server.
- On November 13, 2009 QuadAxis launched its plug computing device product line and development platform, featuring the QuadPlug and QuadPC and running QuadMix, a modified Linux.
- On January 5, 2010, Iomega announced their iConnect network access server.
- On January 7, 2010, Pbxnsip launched its plug computing device the sipJack running pbxnsip: an IP Communications platform.

== See also ==
- Classes of computers
- Computer appliance
- CuBox, a media computer created by SolidRun
- GuruPlug, a plug computer
- DreamPlug, a plug computer
- FreedomBox, a personal server project built on Debian
- Personal web server
- Print server
- Raspberry Pi, a single-board computer
- SheevaPlug, a plug computer
- Stick PC, a computer attached to and powered by a USB or HDMI plug
