= FreedomBox =

Free home server operating system

- Repository: salsa.debian.org/freedombox-team/
- Default user interface: Web interface
- License: Free software (AGPLv3)
- Official website: freedombox.org

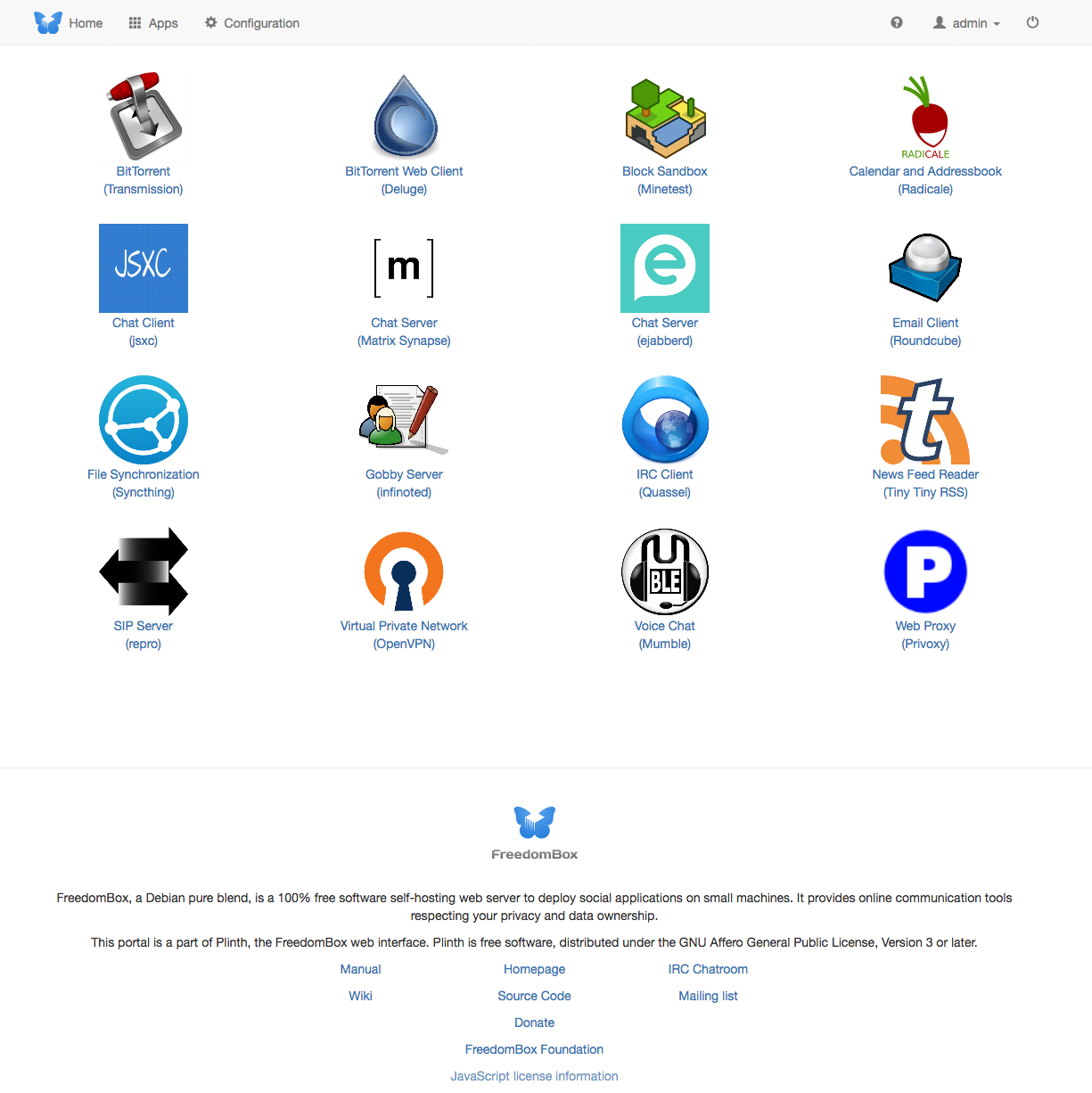
Front page of the FreedomBox user interface with most of the applications installed.

FreedomBox is a free software home server operating system based on Debian, backed by the FreedomBox Foundation.

Launched in 2010, FreedomBox has grown from a software system to an ecosystem including a DIY community, as well as some commercial products.

== History ==
The project was announced by Eben Moglen, Professor of Law at Columbia Law School, in a speech called "Freedom in the Cloud" at the New York ISOC meeting on February 2, 2010. In this speech, Moglen predicted the damage that Facebook would do to society; "Mr. Zuckerberg has attained an unenviable record: he has done more harm to the human race than anybody else his age." In direct response to the threat posed by Facebook in 2010, Moglen argued that FreedomBox should provide the foundation for an alternative Web.

As Steven J. Vaughan Nichols notes, "[Moglen] saw the mess we were heading toward almost 10 years ago. That was before Facebook proved itself to be totally incompetent with security and sold off your data to Cambridge Analytica to scam 50 million US Facebook users with personalized anti-Clinton and pro-Trump propaganda in the 2016 election."

On February 4, 2011, Moglen formed the FreedomBox Foundation to become the organizational headquarters of the project, and on February 18, 2011, the foundation started a campaign to raise $60,000 in 30 days on the crowdfunding service, Kickstarter. The goal was met on February 22, and on March 19, 2011, the campaign ended after collecting $86,724 from 1,007 backers. The early developers aimed to create and preserve personal privacy by providing a secure platform for building decentralized digital applications. They targeted the FreedomBox software for plug computers and single-board computers that can easily be located in individual residences or offices. After 2011, the FreedomBox project continued to grow under different leadership.

In 2017, the project was so successful that "the private sector global technology company ThoughtWorks had hired two developers in India to work on FreedomBox full-time." The FreedomBox project now has a software ecosystem of its own, with contributions from over 60 developers throughout the project's history.

In 2019, the FreedomBox Foundation announced that the first commercial FreedomBox product would be sold by Olimex, a hardware manufacturer. The pioneer edition of FreedomBox home server developed in partnership with Olimex.

== FreedomBox and Debian ==
FreedomBox is a Debian Pure Blend, and all of its applications are installed as Debian packages. The FreedomBox project itself distributes its software through Debian repositories.

FreedomBox also features automatic software updates powered by Debian.

== Hardware neutrality ==
FreedomBox is designed to be hardware neutral: its developers aim for it to be installable on almost any computer hardware. One of the benefits of being a Debian Pure Blend is that FreedomBox inherits the diverse hardware compatibility of Debian.

As of April 2019, FreedomBox is packaged in custom operating system images for 11 single-board computers. The hardware currently put forward for use with the FreedomBox software is explained on the Hardware page. OSHW designs are preferred, like the Olimex A20 OLinuXino Lime 2 or the BeagleBone Black. Closed-source boards like the DreamPlug, Cubietruck and the Raspberry Pi are possible options, while more are on the way. There is also a VirtualBox image. FreedomBox can additionally be installed over a clean Debian installation.

== Commercial product ==
On April 22, 2019, the FreedomBox Foundation announced plans to sell a home server kit called a "FreedomBox" as a commercial product. Production and sales were managed by the hardware company Olimex. The product is designed to make it easier for laypeople to host their own servers.

== See also ==
- arkOS
- Commotion Wireless
- Mesh networking
- Personal data manager
- PirateBox (similar project to FreedomBox)
- Wireless mesh network
