= GuruPlug =

2010 compact plug computer

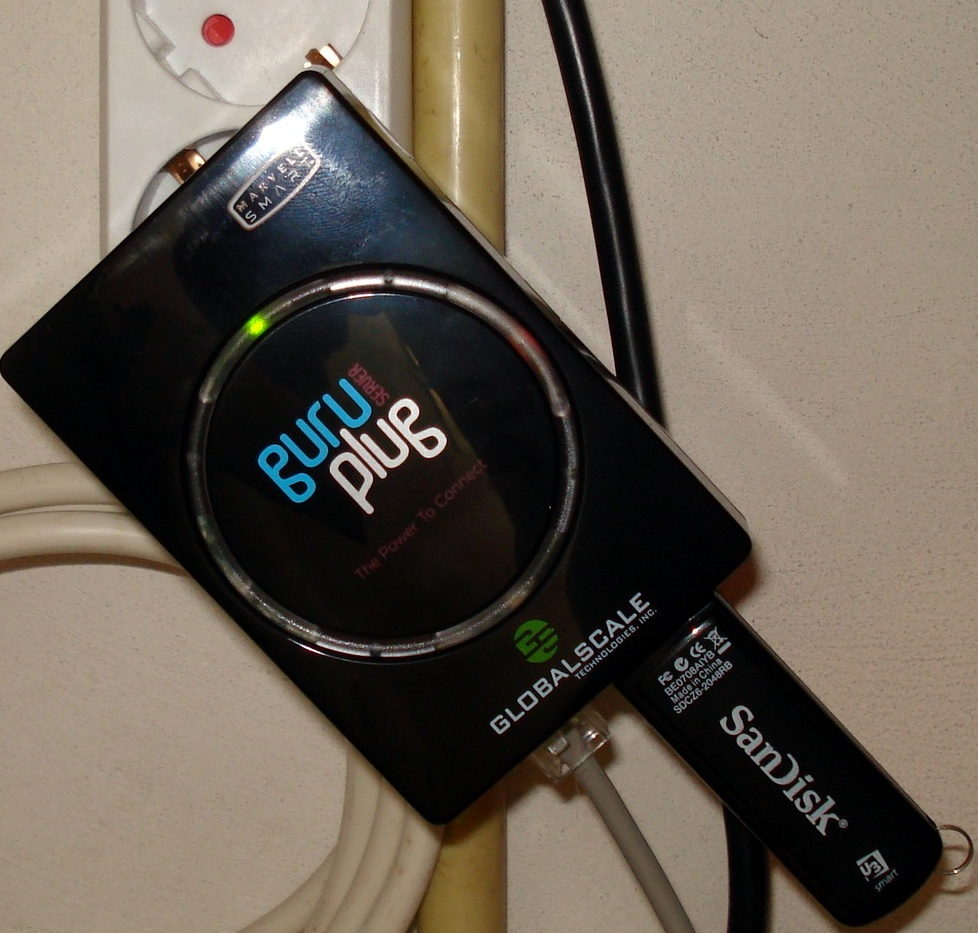
- A GuruPlug in a wall socket
- Manufacturer: Marvell
- Type: Plug computer
- Released: 2010
- Operating system: Debian
- CPU: 1.2 GHz ARM Marvell Kirkwood 6281 (ARM9E)
- Memory: 512 MB SDRAM, 512 MB NAND
- Storage: External hard drive/flash disk/internal NAND
- Display: none
- Connectivity: USB 2.0, Gigabit Ethernet, JTAG, Bluetooth 2.1, Wi-Fi 802.11 b/g
- Dimensions: 95 x 65 x 48.5 (mm)
- Predecessor: SheevaPlug
- Successor: DreamPlug

GuruPlug is a compact and low power plug computer running Linux. It is intended to be a device that could act as a web server, a print server or any other network service. It has local storage in NAND Flash, but also offers USB ports and a Serial ATA port to connect external hard disks.

The first versions of the GuruPlug Plus had no moving parts such as fans. Combined with the low power ARM architecture CPU, this results in both power consumption and noise level being typically lower compared to desktop PCs. However, these units had significant heating issues and were prone to overheating (the lack of a temperature sensor could form a safety issue when the unit is left running for multiple days). Newer versions of the GuruPlug Plus manage the overheating problem by adding a 2-cm fan to the design, although this eliminates the benefit of the silent design. The fan is not software-controllable and makes a sound resembling that of a hair dryer. The standard version of GuruPlug still has no fan and thus produces no noise.

In the area of small and low-power computing, SheevaPlug was its predecessor.

== Variants and modifications ==
The GuruPlug comes in three variants: GuruPlug Server Standard, GuruPlug Server Plus and GuruPlug Display. The Plus version features a second Gigabit Ethernet, an eSATA and MicroSD Slot. The Display version features an HDMI display port.
