= Classes of computers =

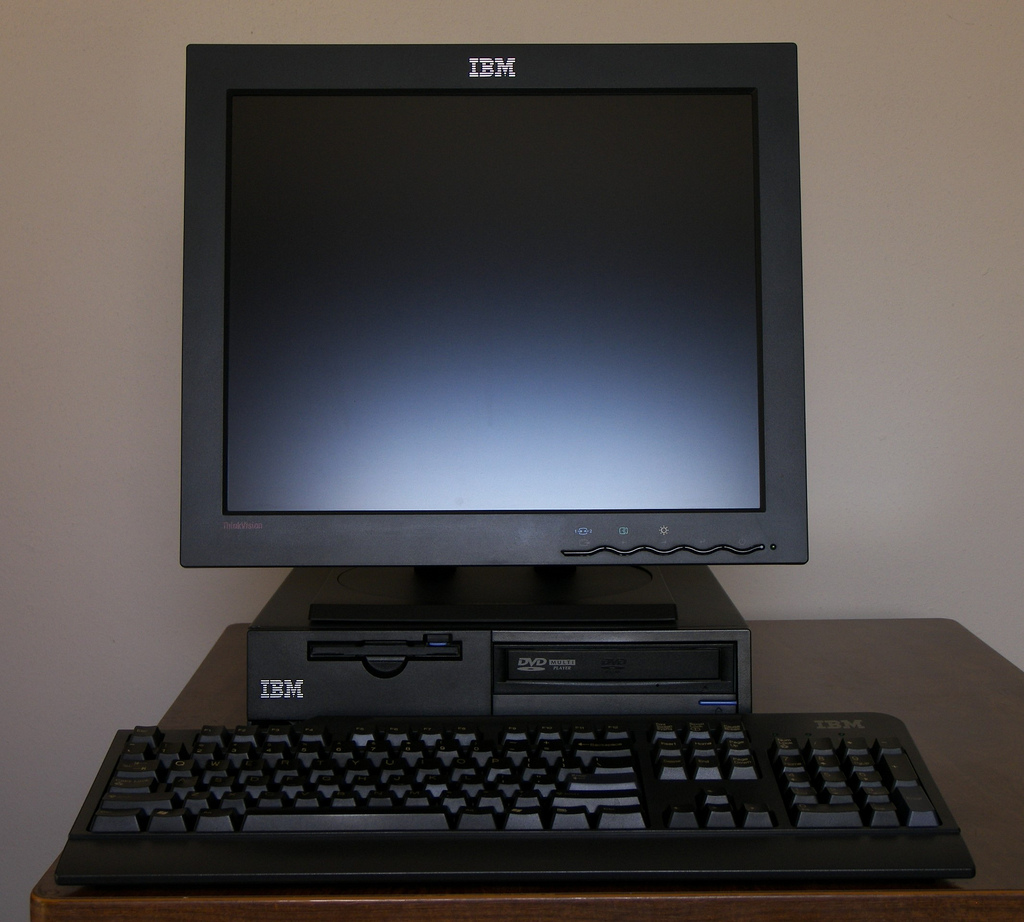
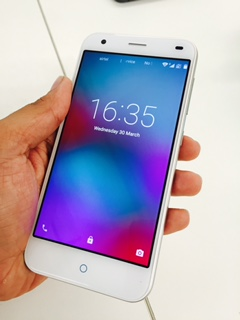
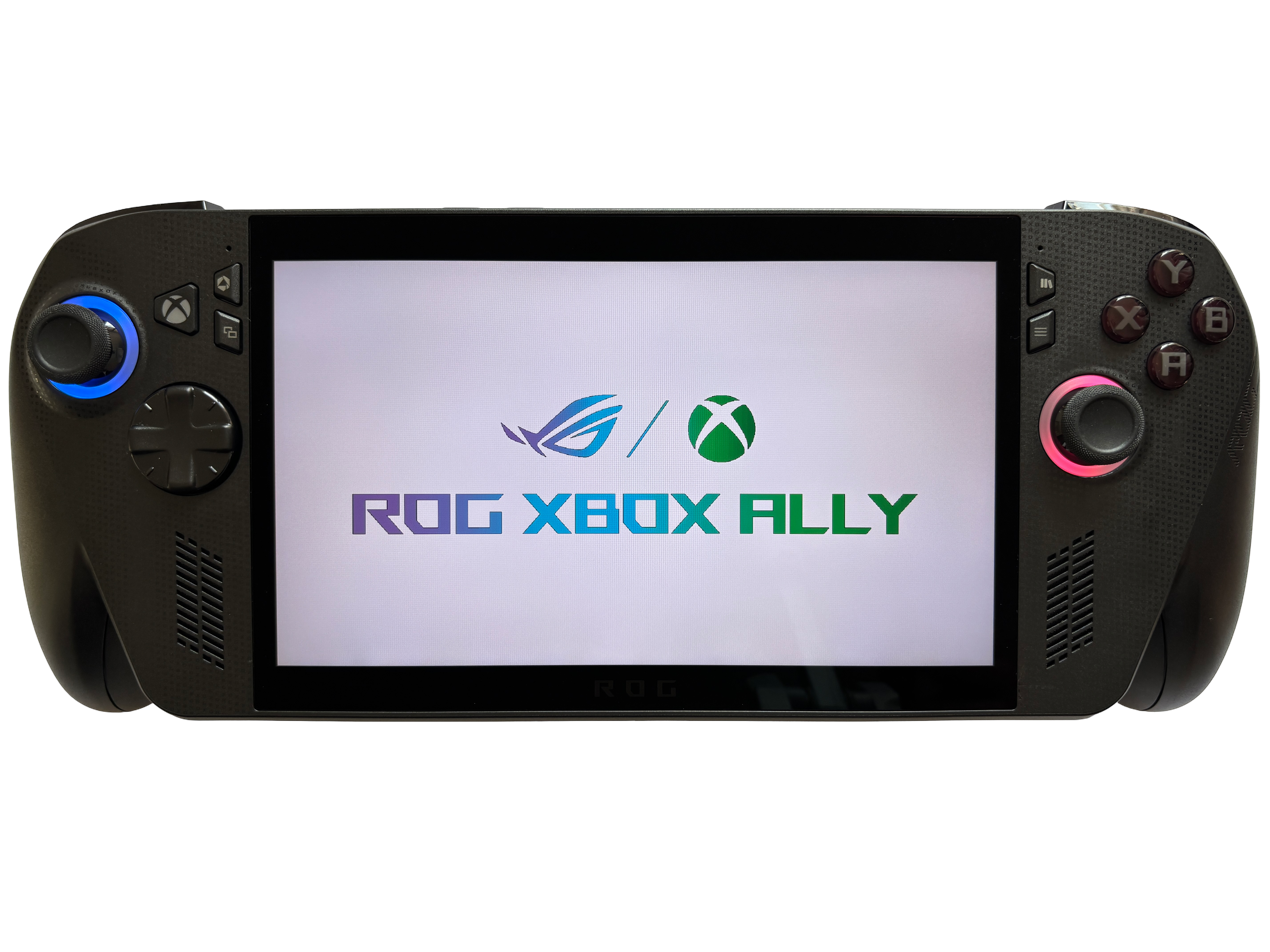
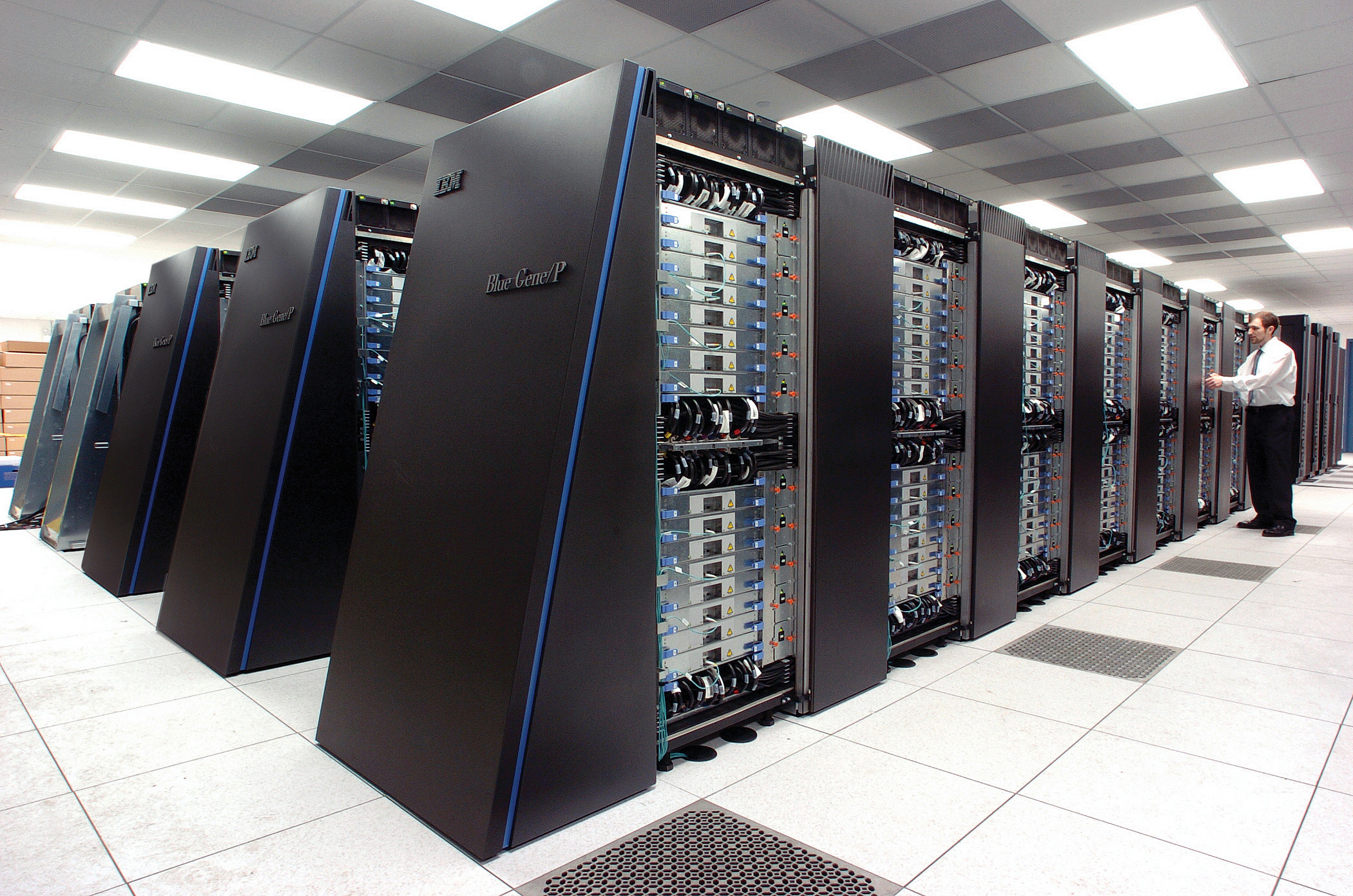
Different types of computers – clockwise from top left:
Desktop computer (IBM ThinkCentre S50 with monitor)
Smartphone (LYF Water 2)
Supercomputer (IBM Blue Gene/P)
Handheld game console (ROG Xbox Ally)

Digital computers can be classified, or typed, in many ways. Some common classifications of computers are given below.

== Classes by purpose ==
Classification of Computers

Computer
Analog	Hybrid	Digital
Super Computers	Mainframe Computers	Mobile Computers	Mini Computers	Micro Computers

=== Microcomputers (personal computers) ===
Microcomputers became the most common type of computer in the late 20th century. The term "microcomputer" was introduced with the advent of systems based on single-chip microprocessors. The best-known early system was the Altair 8800, introduced in 1975. The term "microcomputer" has practically become an anachronism as it has fallen into disuse.

These computers include:

- Desktop computers – A case put under or on a desk. The display may be optional, depending on use. The case size may vary, depending on the required expansion slots. Very small computers of this kind may be integrated into the monitor.
- Rackmount computers – The cases of these computers fit into 19-inch racks, and may be space-optimized and very flat. A dedicated display, keyboard, and mouse may not exist, but a KVM switch or built-in remote control (via LAN or other means) can be used to gain console access. Many servers are rackmount computers and data centers may have dozens or hundreds of racks with hundreds or thousands of rackmount computers acting as servers.
- In-car computers (carputers) – Built into automobiles, for entertainment, navigation, etc.
- Laptops and notebook computers – Portable and all in one case.
- Tablet computer – Like laptops, but with a touch-screen, entirely replacing the physical keyboard.
- Smartphones, smartbooks, and palmtop computers – Small handheld personal computers with limited hardware specifications.
- Programmable calculator – Like small handhelds, but specialized in mathematical work.
- Video game consoles – Fixed computers built specifically for entertainment purposes.
- Handheld game consoles – The same as game consoles, but small and portable.

=== Minicomputers (mid-range computers) ===
Minicomputers (colloquially, minis) are a class of multi-user computers that lie in the middle range of the computing spectrum, in between the smallest mainframe computers and the largest single-user systems (microcomputers or personal computers). The term supermini computer or simply supermini was used to distinguish more powerful minicomputers that approached mainframes in capability. Superminis (such as the DEC VAX or Data General Eclipse MV/8000) were usually 32-bit at a time when most minicomputers (such as the PDP-11 or Data General Eclipse or IBM Series/1) were 16-bit. These traditional minicomputers in the last few decades of the 20th century, found in small to medium-sized businesses, laboratories and embedded in (for example) hospital CAT scanners, often would be rack-mounted and connect to one or more terminals or tape/card readers, like mainframes and unlike most personal computers, but require less space and electrical power than a typical mainframe. This term has fallen into disuse.

=== Mainframe computers ===
The term mainframe computer was created to distinguish the traditional, large, institutional computer intended to service multiple users from the smaller, single-user machines. These computers are capable of handling and processing very large amounts of data quickly. Mainframe computers are used in large institutions such as government, banks, and large corporations. They are measured in MIPS (million instructions per second) and can respond to hundreds of millions of users at a time.

=== Supercomputers ===
A supercomputer is focused on performing tasks involving intense numerical calculations such as weather forecasting, fluid dynamics, nuclear simulations, theoretical astrophysics, and complex scientific computations. A supercomputer is a computer that is at the front-line of current processing capacity, particularly speed of calculation. The term supercomputer itself is rather fluid, and the speed of today's supercomputers tends to become typical of tomorrow's ordinary computer. Supercomputer processing speeds are measured in floating-point operations per second, or FLOPS. An example of a floating-point operation is the calculation of mathematical equations in real numbers. In terms of computational capability, memory size and speed, I/O technology, and topological issues such as bandwidth and latency, supercomputers are the most powerful, are very expensive, and not cost-effective just to perform batch or transaction processing.

== Classes by function ==
=== Servers ===
Server usually refers to a computer that is dedicated to providing one or more services. A server is expected to be reliable (e.g. error-correction of RAM; redundant cooling; self-monitoring, RAID), fit for running for several years, and giving useful diagnosis in case of an error. For even increased security, the server may be mirrored. Many smaller servers are actually personal computers that have been dedicated to provide services for other computers.

- A database server is a server which uses a database application that provides database services to other computer programs or to computers. Database management systems (DBMSs) frequently provide database-server functionality, and some database management systems (such as MySQL) rely exclusively on the client–server model for database access while others (such as SQLite) are meant for using as an embedded database. Users access a database server either through a "front end" running on the user's computer – which displays requested data – or through the "back end", which runs on the server and handles tasks such as data analysis and storage.
- A file server does not normally perform computational tasks or run programs on behalf of its client workstations but manage and store a large collection of computer files. The crucial function of a file server is storage. File servers are commonly found in schools and offices, where users use a local area network to connect their client computers and use Network-attached storage (NAS) systems to provide data access.
- A web server is a server that can satisfy client requests on the World Wide Web. A web server can, in general, contain one or more websites. A web server processes incoming network requests over HTTP and several other related protocols. The primary function of a web server is to store, process and deliver web pages to clients. The communication between client and server takes place using the Hypertext Transfer Protocol (HTTP). Pages delivered are most frequently HTML documents, which may include images, style sheets and scripts in addition to the text content.
- A terminal server enables organizations to connect devices with an RS-232, RS-422 or RS-485 serial interface to a local area network (LAN). Products marketed as terminal servers can be very simple devices that do not offer any security functionality, such as data encryption and user authentication. These provide GUI sessions that can be used by client PCs that work someway like a remote control. Only the screen (and audio) output is shown on the client. The GUI applications run on the server, data (like in files) would be stored in the same LAN, thus avoiding problems, should a client PC be damaged or stolen.

A server may run several virtual machines (VMs) for different activities, supplying the same environment to each VM as if it ran on dedicated hardware. Different operating systems (OS) can therefore be run at the same time. This technology approach needs special hardware support to be useful and was first the domain of mainframes and other large computers. Nowadays, most personal computers are equipped for this task, but for long-term operation or critical systems, specialized server hardware may be needed.
Another approach is to implement VMs on the operating system level, so all VMs run on the same OS instance (or incarnation), but are fundamentally separated to not interfere with each other.

=== Workstations ===
Workstations are computers that are intended to serve one user and may contain special hardware enhancements not found on a personal computer. By the mid-1990s personal computers reached the processing capabilities of mini computers and workstations. Also, with the release of multi-tasking systems such as OS/2, Windows NT and Linux, the operating systems of personal computers could do the job of this class of machines. Today, the term is used to describe desktop PCs with high-performance hardware. Such hardware is usually aimed at a professional, rather than enthusiast, market (e.g. dual-processor motherboards, error-correcting memory, professional graphics cards).

=== Information appliances ===
Information appliances are computers specially designed to perform a specific "user-friendly" function—such as editing text, playing music, photography, videography etc. The term is most commonly applied to battery-operated mobile devices, though there are also wearable devices.

=== Embedded computers ===
Embedded computers are computers that are a part of a machine or device. Embedded computers generally execute a program that is stored in non-volatile memory and is only intended to operate a specific machine or device. Embedded computers are very common. The majority are microcontrollers. Embedded computers are typically required to operate continuously without being reset or rebooted, and once employed in their task the software usually cannot be modified. An automobile may contain a number of embedded computers; however, a washing machine or DVD player would contain only one microcontroller. Embedded computers are chosen to meet the requirements of the specific application, and most are slower and cheaper than CPUs found in a personal computer.

== Classes by usage ==
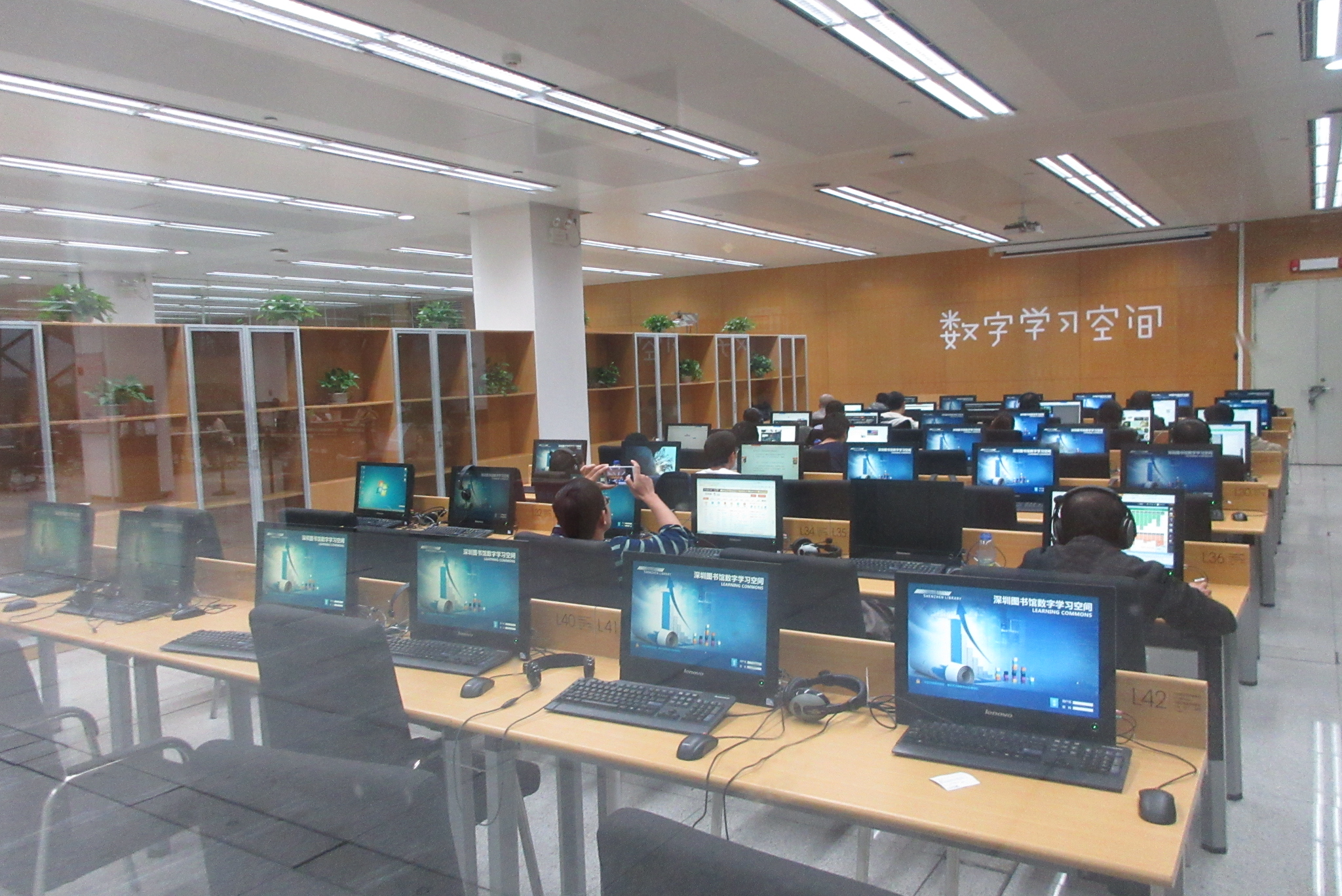
Computers in a library for public use

=== Public computer ===
Public computers are open for public uses, possibly as an Interactive kiosk. There are many places where one can use them, such as cybercafes, schools and libraries.

They are normally fire-walled and restricted to run only their pre-installed software. The operating system is difficult to change and/or resides on a file server. For example, "thin client" machines in educational establishments may be reset to their original state between classes. Public computers are generally not expected to keep an individual's data files.

=== Personal computer ===
A personal computer has one user who may also be the owner (although the term has also come also mean any computer hardware somewhat like the original IBM PC, irrespective of how it is used). This user often may use all hardware resources, has complete access to any part of the computer and has rights to install/remove software. Personal computers normally store personal files, and often the owner/user is responsible for routine maintenance such as removing unwanted files and virus-scanning. Some computers in a business setting are for one user but are also served by staff with protocols to ensure proper maintenance.

=== Shared computer ===
These are computers where different people might log on at different times; unlike public computers, they would have usernames and passwords assigned on a long-term basis, with the files they see and the computer's settings adjusted to their particular account. Often the important data files will reside on a central file server, so a person could log onto different computers yet still see the same files. The computer (or workstation) might be a "thin client" or X terminal, otherwise it may have its own disk for some or all system files, but usually will need to be networked to the rest of the system for full functionality. Such systems normally require a system administrator to set up and maintain the hardware and software.

=== Display computer ===
Computers that are used just to display selected material (usually audio-visual, or simple slide shows) in a shop, meeting or trade show. These computers may have more capabilities than they are being used for; they are likely to have WiFi and so be capable of Internet access, but are rarely firewalled (but have restricted port access or monitored in some way). Such computers are used and maintained as appliances, and not normally used as the primary store for important files.

== Classed by generation of computer technology ==
The history of computing hardware is often used to reference the different generations of computing devices:

- First generation computers (1940–1955): It used vacuum tubes such as the 6J6 or specially designed tubes - or even mechanical arrangements, and were relatively slow, energy-hungry and the earliest computers were less flexible in their programmability.
- Second generation computers (1956–1963): It used discrete transistors, and thus smaller and consumes less power.
- Third generation computers (1964–1970): It used Integrated Circuits (ICs), the main difference between hardware in computers of the 1960s and today being the density of transistors in each IC (beginning with Small Scale Integration chips like the Transistor-transistor logic (TTL) SN7400 gates with 20 transistors, through Medium Scale Integration and Large Scale Integration to Very-large-scale integration (VLSI) with over ten billion transistors in a single silicon-based IC "chip".
- Fourth generation computers (1971–present): It uses Microprocessors, as millions of ICs were built onto a single silicon-based chip. Since then form factor of computers reduced, task processing & graphic rendering improved and it became more battery-powered with the advent of personal mobile devices such as laptops, tablets, smartphones etc.

== Classed by tier ==
High performance computing can be described by the scale of its impact:

- Tier-0: Continent leading
- Tier-1: National Centers
- Tier-2: Institutional & Regional Centers
- Tier-3: Departmental / Local Systems

== See also ==
- Lisp machine
- List of computer size categories
- Bell's law of computer classes
- Analog computers
- Feng's classification
- Flynn's taxonomy
