= Mobile device =

Small, handheld computing device

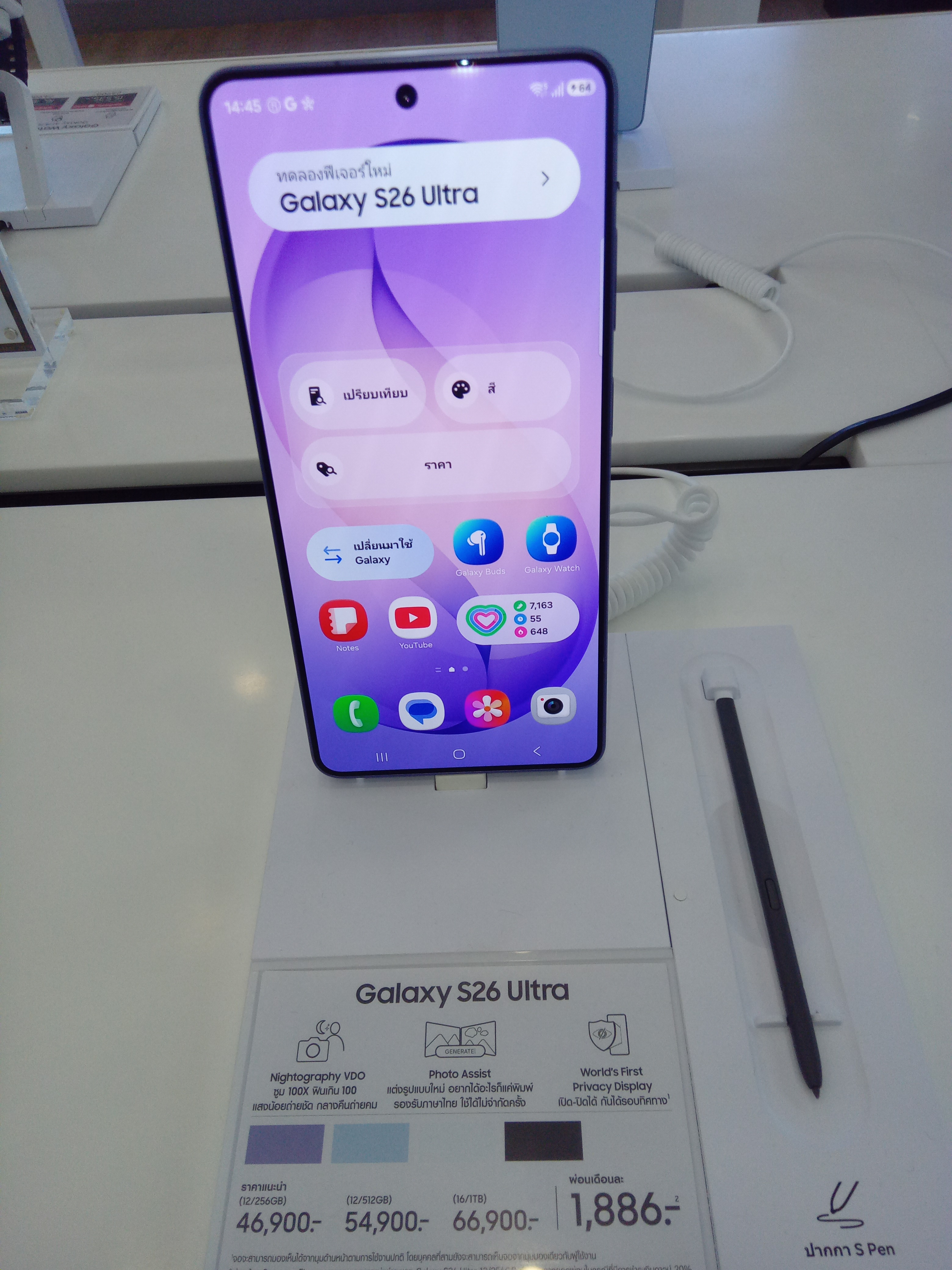
Samsung Galaxy S26 Ultra – example of a mobile device

A mobile device or handheld device is a computer small enough to hold and operate in hand. Mobile devices are typically battery-powered and possess a flat-panel display and one or more built-in input devices, such as a touchscreen or keypad. Modern mobile devices often emphasize wireless networking, to both the Internet and to other devices in their vicinity, such as headsets or in-car entertainment systems, via Wi-Fi, Bluetooth, cellular networks, or near-field communication.

== Characteristics ==
Device mobility can be viewed in the context of several qualities:

- Physical dimensions and weight
- Whether the device is mobile or some kind of host to which it is attached is mobile
- What kind of host devices it can be bound with
- How devices communicate with a host
- When mobility occurs

Strictly speaking, many so-called mobile devices are not mobile. It is the host that is mobile, i.e., a mobile human host carries a non-mobile smartphone device. An example of a true mobile computing device, where the device itself is mobile, is a robot. Another example is an autonomous vehicle.

There are three basic ways mobile devices can be physically bound to mobile hosts:

- Accompanied,
- Surface-mounted, or
- Embedded into the fabric of a host, e.g., an embedded controller in a host device.

Accompanied refers to an object being loosely bound and accompanying a mobile host, e.g., a smartphone can be carried in a bag or pocket but can easily be misplaced. Hence, mobile hosts with embedded devices such as an autonomous vehicle can appear larger than pocket-sized.

The most common size of a mobile computing device is pocket-sized, but other sizes for mobile devices exist. Mark Weiser, known as the father of ubiquitous computing, referred to device sizes that are tab-sized, pad, and board sized, where tabs are defined as accompanied or wearable centimeter-sized devices, e.g. smartphones, phablets and tablets are defined as hand-held decimeter-sized devices. If one changes the form of the mobile devices in terms of being non-planar, one can also have skin devices and tiny dust-sized devices.

Dust refers to miniaturized devices without direct HCI interfaces, e.g., micro-electromechanical systems (MEMS), ranging from nanometers through micrometers to millimeters. See also Smart dust. Skin: fabrics based upon light emitting and conductive polymers and organic computer devices. These can be formed into more flexible non-planar display surfaces and products such as clothes and curtains, see OLED display. Also, see smart device.

Although mobility is often regarded as synonymous with having wireless connectivity, these terms are different. Not all network access by mobile users, applications, and devices needs to be via wireless networks and vice versa. Wireless access devices can be static and mobile users can move between wired and wireless hotspots such as in Internet cafés. Some mobile devices can be used as mobile Internet devices to access the Internet while moving, but they do not need to do this and many phone functions or applications are still operational even while disconnected from the Internet.

What makes the mobile device unique compared to other technologies is the inherent flexibility in the hardware and software. Flexible applications include video chat, web browsing, payment systems, near field communication, audio recording etc. Many services used on mobile devices rely on cloud computing, which is designed to be accessed over a network from a wide range of devices, including mobile phones, tablets and laptops. Although a common form of mobile device, a smartphone, has a display, another perhaps even more common form of smart computing device, the smart card, e.g., used as a bank card or travel card, does not have a display. This mobile device often has a CPU and memory but needs to connect or be inserted into a reader to display its internal data or state.

== Types ==
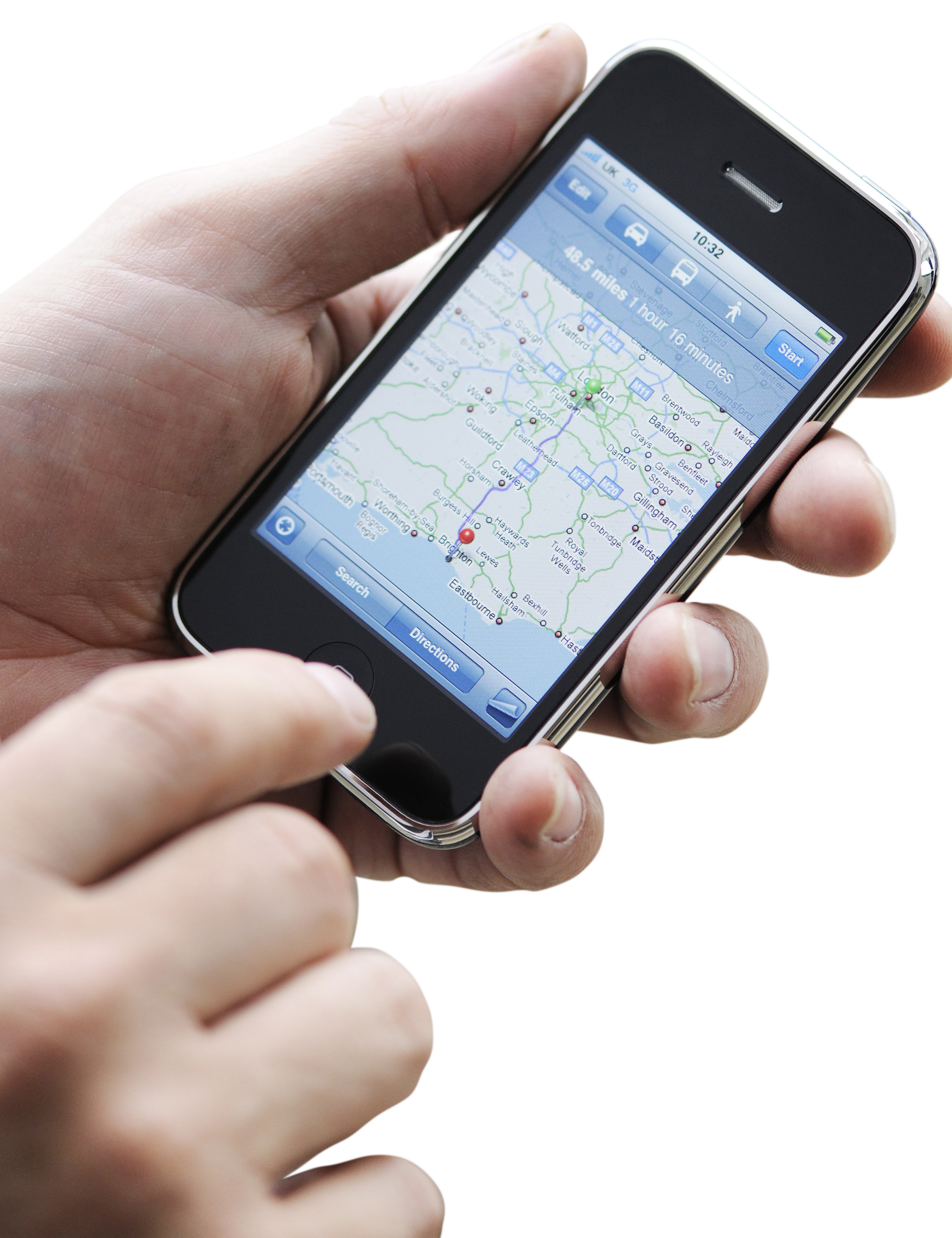
Smartphone (iPhone)

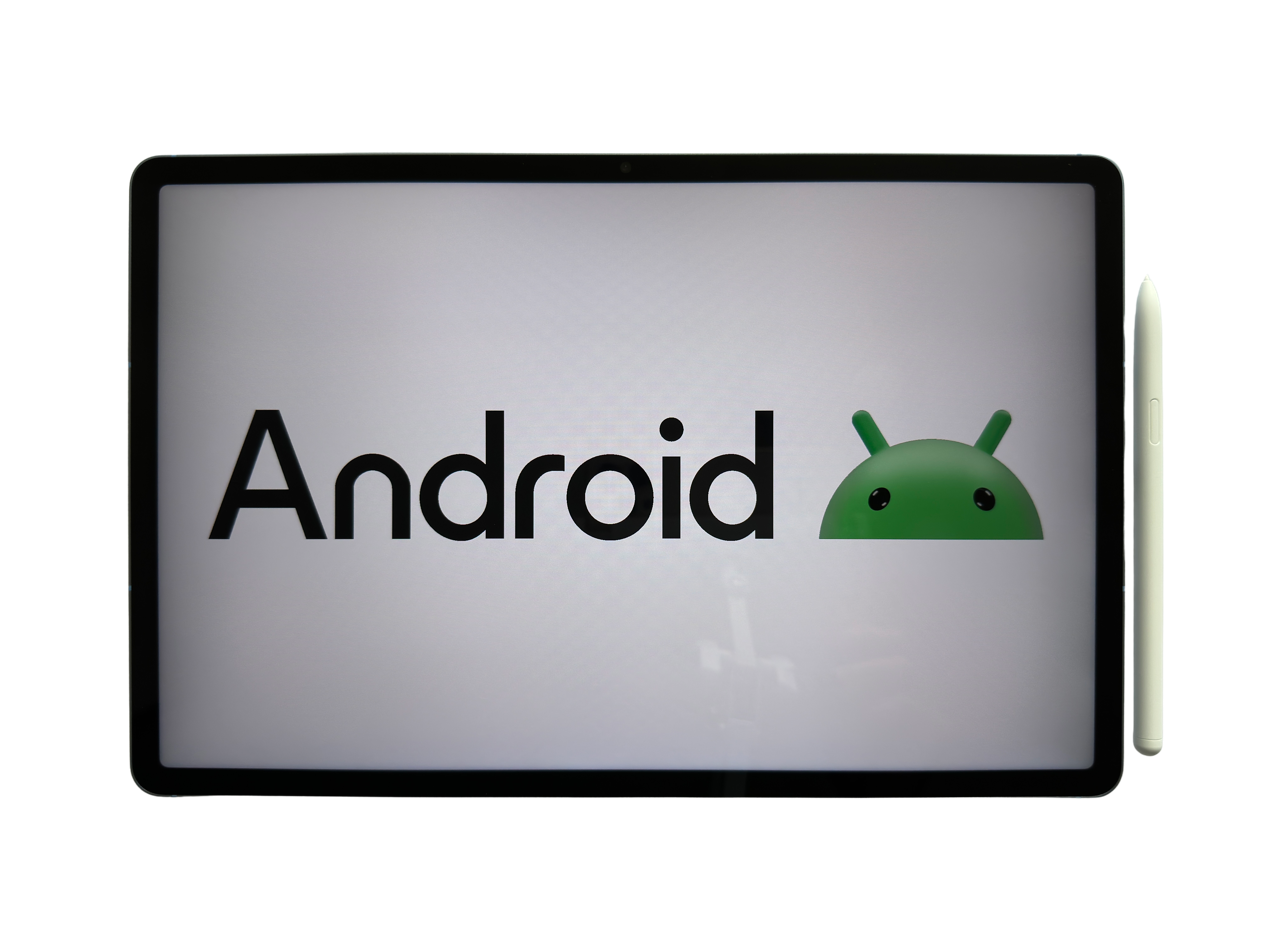
Android tablet computer (Samsung Galaxy Tab)

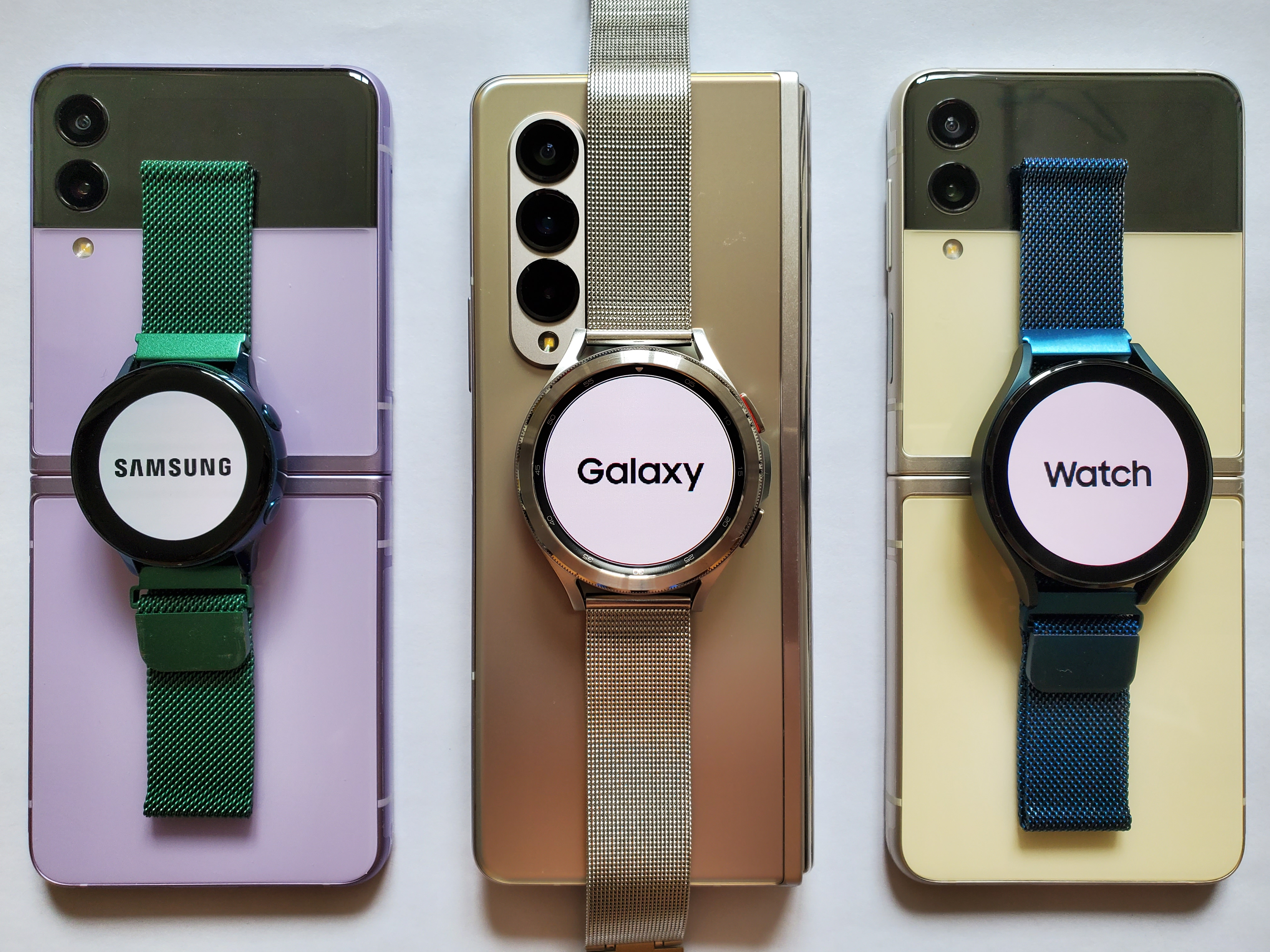
Smartwatches (Samsung Galaxy Watch)

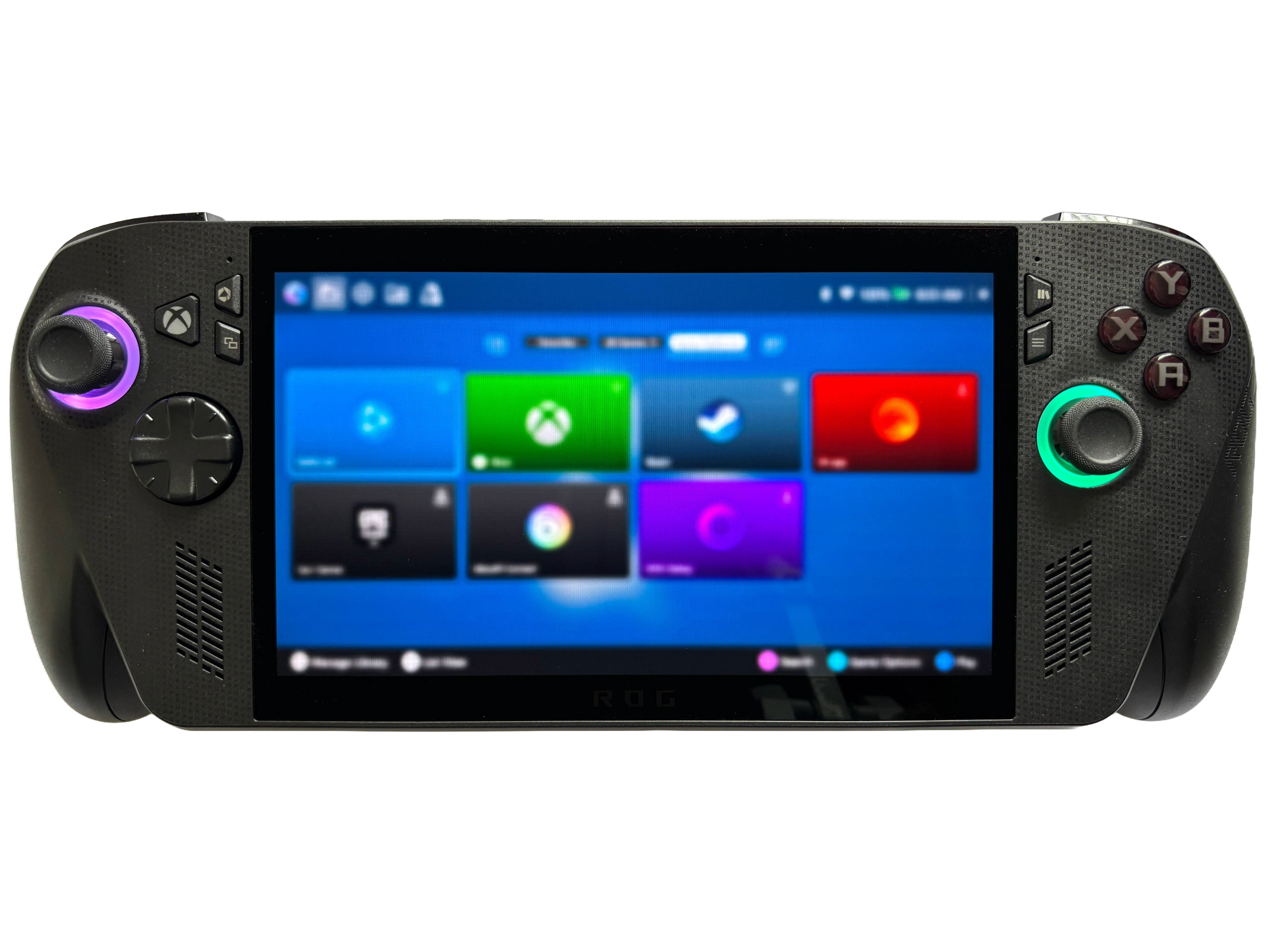
Handheld gaming computer (ROG Xbox Ally)

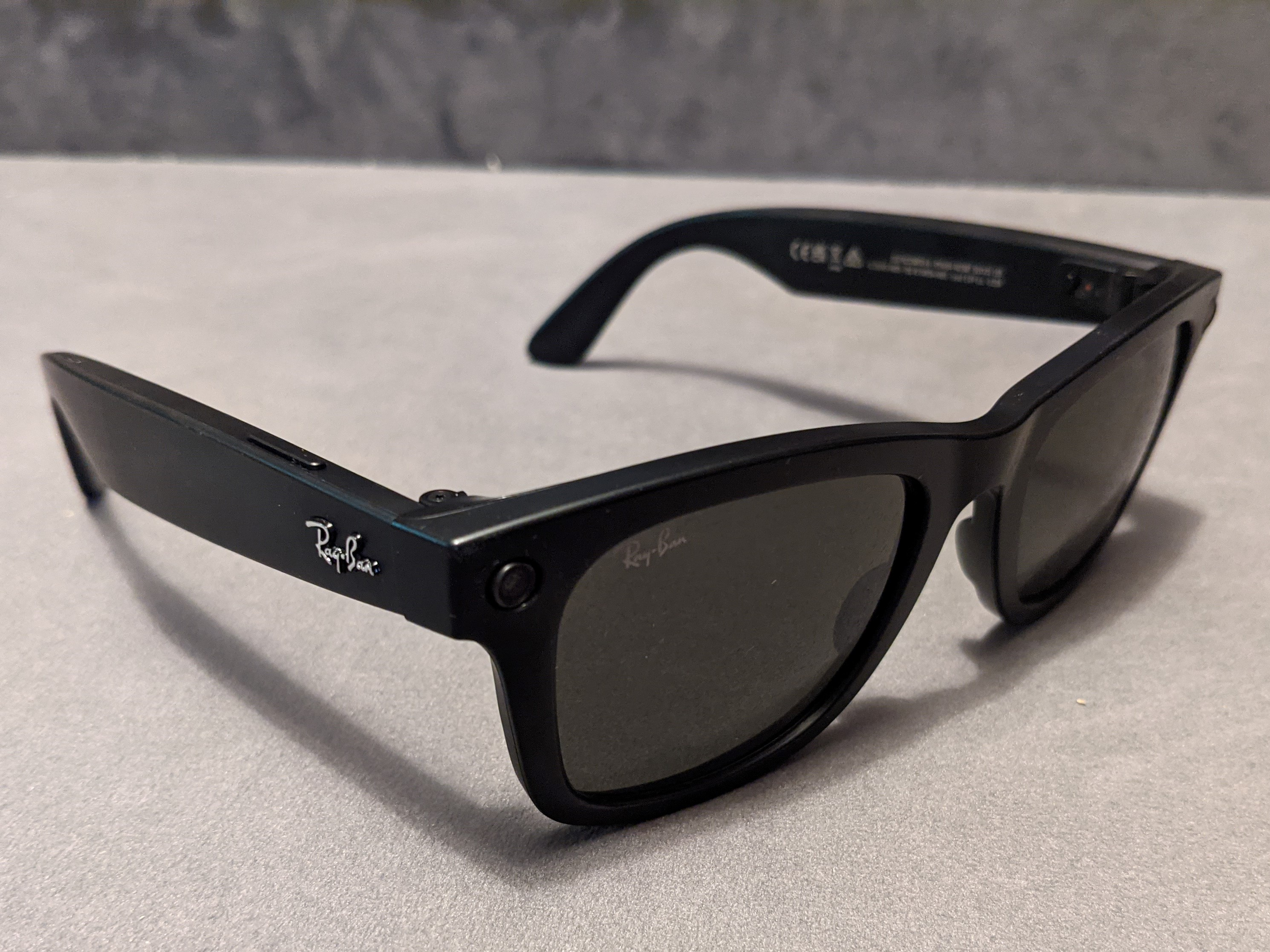
Smart glasses (Ray-Ban Stories)

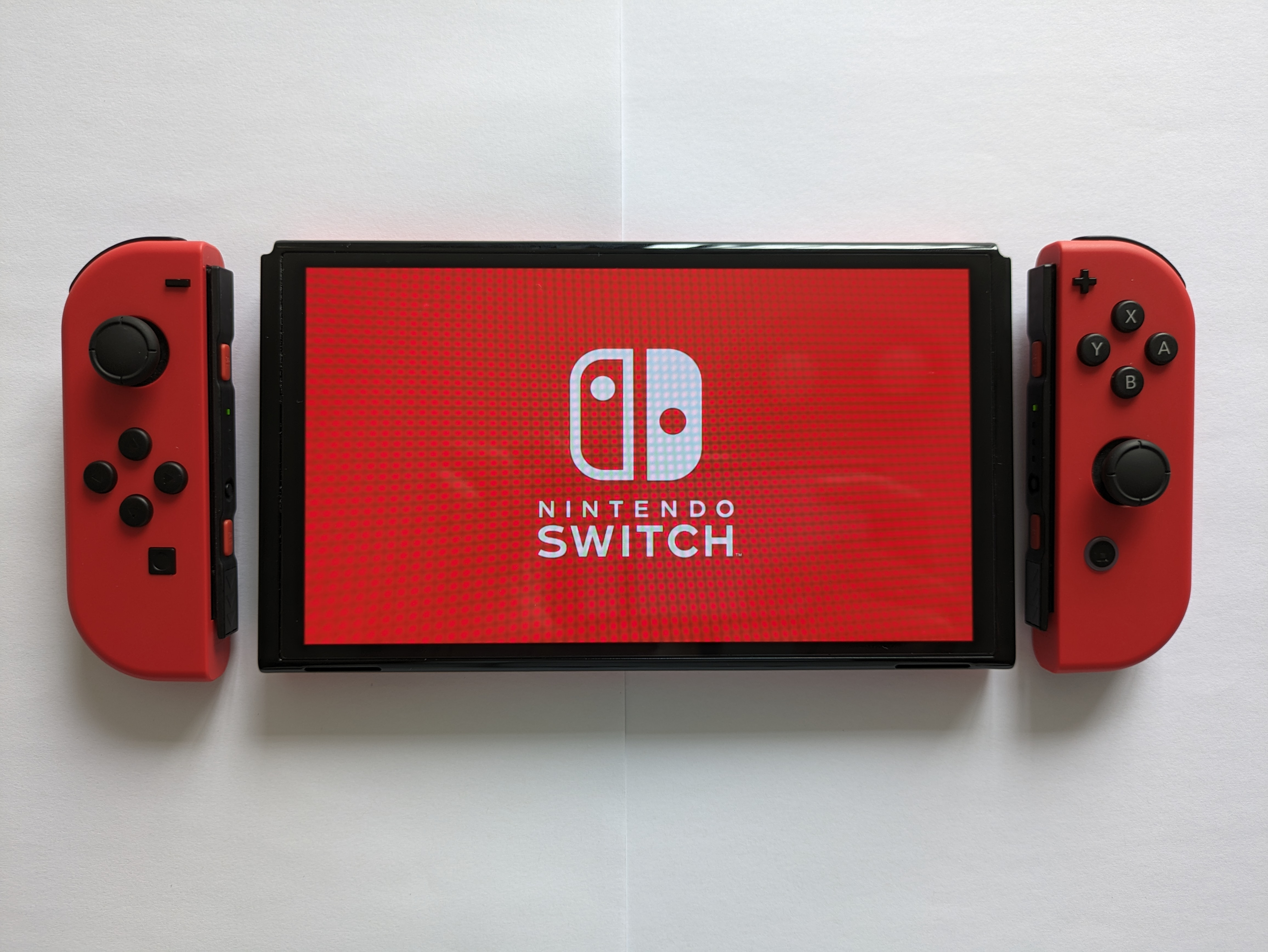
Handheld video game console (Nintendo Switch)

There are many kinds of mobile devices, designed for different applications. They include, but are not limited to:

- Mobile computers
  - Laptop
  - Netbook
  - Tablet computer
  - Pocket computer
  - Ultra-mobile PC
  - Handheld PC
  - Mobile Internet device (MID)
  - Personal digital assistant (PDA)
  - Enterprise digital assistant (EDA)
- Handheld game console
- Mobile phone
  - Camera phone
  - Feature phone
  - Smartphone
  - Foldable smartphone
- Digital camera
  - Digital camcorder
  - Digital still camera (DSC)
  - Digital video camera (DVC)
- Pager
- Portable media player
- Satellite navigation device
- Wearable computer
  - Smartwatch
  - Smartglasses
  - Head-mounted display
  - Smart ring

== History ==
The history of the mobile device has been marked by increasing technological convergence. Early mobile devices—such as pocket calculators, portable media players, satellite navigation devices, and digital camera—excelled at their intended use but were not multifaceted. Personal digital assistants (PDAs) proliferated in the 1990s as a way to quickly write down notes, schedule business appointments, and set personal reminders, as a handheld supplement to bulkier laptops.

During the same period, the mobile phone evolved from supporting voice communication only to accommodating text messaging, Internet connectivity, multimedia, and videotelephony. These feature phones eventually gave way to the modern smartphone, which combined all the aforementioned devices, and more, into one device. Since the late 2000s, smartphones have been the most common mobile device in the world, in terms of quantity sold, owing to their great convergence of technologies.

== Uses ==
By the early 2010s, mobile devices began integrating sensors such as accelerometers, magnetometers, and gyroscopes, allowing the detection of orientation and motion. Mobile devices may provide biometric user authentication, such as face recognition or fingerprint recognition.

Handheld devices such as enterprise digital assistants have become more rugged for use in mobile field management. This involves tasks such as digitizing notes, sending and receiving invoices, asset management, recording signatures, managing parts, and scanning barcodes and RFID tags.

In 2009, developments in mobile collaboration systems enabled the use of handheld devices that combine video, audio, and on-screen drawing capabilities to enable multi-party conferencing in real-time, independent of location. Handheld computers are available in a variety of form factors, including smartphones, handheld PDAs, Ultra-mobile PC and tablet computers (Palm OS, WebOS). Users can watch television through the Internet by IPTV on some mobile devices. Mobile television receivers have existed since 1960, and, in the 21st-century, mobile phone providers began making television available on cellular phones.

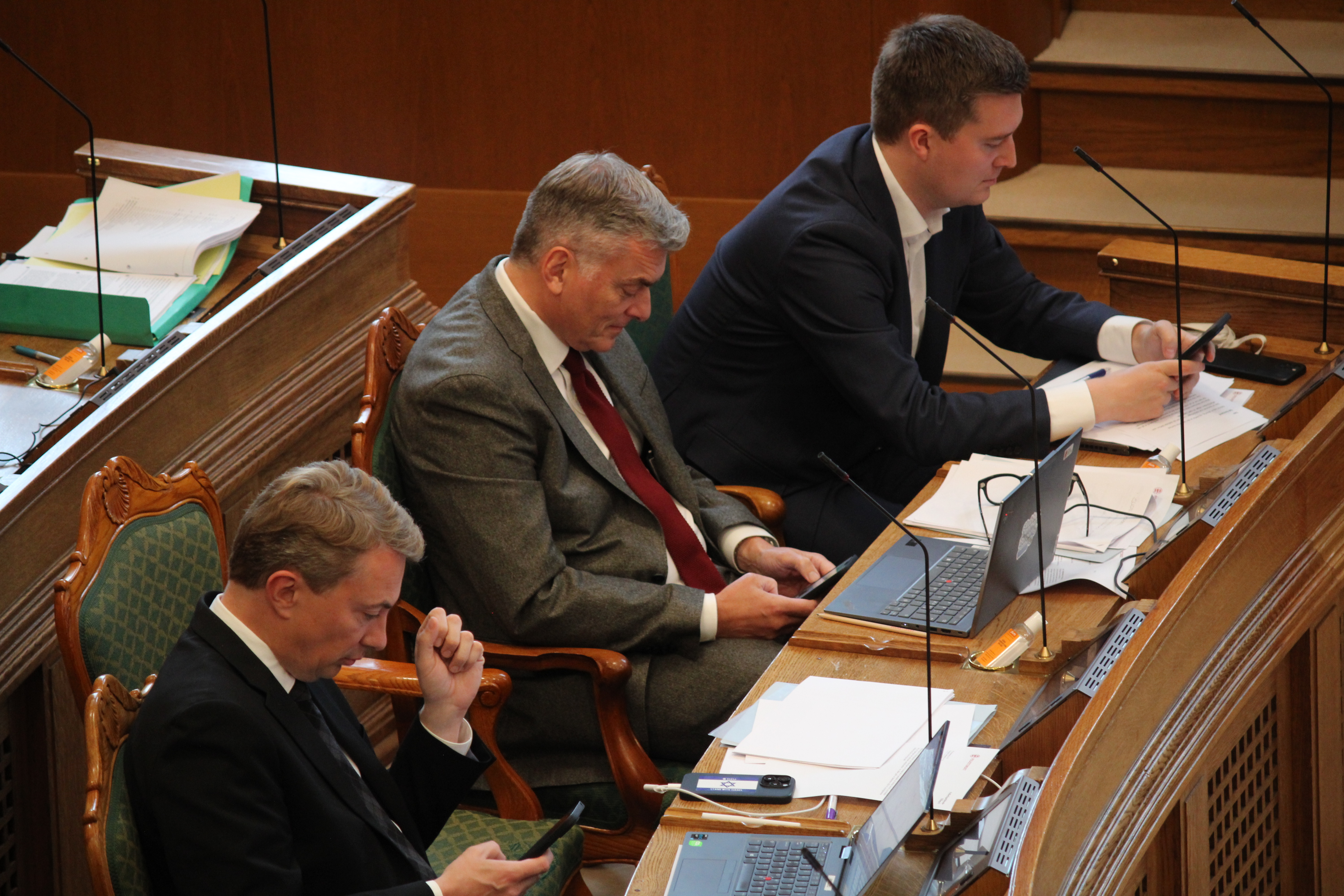
Danish politicians using phones during a parliament session in 2025

In the 2010s, mobile devices were observed to frequently include the ability to sync and share a variety of data despite the distance or specifications of the devices. In the medical field, mobile devices are quickly becoming essential tools for accessing clinical information such as drugs, treatment, and even medical calculations. Due to the popularity of mobile gaming, the gambling industry started offering casino games on mobile devices, which led to the inclusion of these devices in the anti-hazard legislature as devices that could potentially be used for illegal gambling. Additional potentially unlawful actions could encompass the utilization of mobile devices in disseminating explicit material involving minors. Moreover, the legitimate adult entertainment sector's incorporation of mobile apps and technology to advance its operations raises concerns. There is also a prospect of leveraging mobile devices to facilitate cross-border services, warranting regulatory attention.

Within the military domain, mobile devices have introduced novel prospects for delivering training and educational resources to soldiers, irrespective of their stationed location.

== See also ==
- Mobile interaction
- Problematic smartphone use

== Sources ==
- "Mobile Devices". Library Technology Reports. 44 (5): 10–15. 2008. Archived from the original on 2013-05-07 – via Questia.
- Hanson, C. W. (2011). "Chapter 2: Mobile Devices in 2011". Library Technology Reports. 47 (2): 11–23. Archived from the original on 2013-05-07 – via Questia.
