= RedSleeve =

- Screenshot
- Developer: The RedSleeve Project
- OS family: Unix-like (based on RHEL)
- Working state: Current
- Source model: Open source
- Initial release: February 12, 2012; 14 years ago
- Marketing target: Free computing (desktops, servers, workstations)
- Available in: Multilingual
- Update method: Yum (PackageKit)
- Package manager: RPM Package Manager
- Supported platforms: ARM
- Kernel type: Monolithic (Linux)
- Default user interface: GNOME and KDE (user-selectable)
- License: GNU GPL and others.
- Official website: RedSleeve.org

RedSleeve is a free operating system distribution based on the Linux kernel. It is derived from the Red Hat Enterprise Linux (RHEL) distribution, ported to the ARM architecture.

RedSleeve is derived from the free and open-source software made available by Red Hat, Inc., but is not produced, maintained or supported by Red Hat. Specifically, this product is built from the source code for Red Hat Enterprise Linux versions, under the terms and conditions of Red Hat Enterprise Linux's EULA and the GNU General Public License. The name RedSleeve was chosen because it makes it intuitively obvious what upstream distribution it is derived from, while at the same time implying that it is for the ARM platform (we have sleeves covering our ARMs).

RedSleeve is different from other Red Hat Enterprise Linux derivatives such as CentOS and Scientific Linux in that it is also a port to a new platform (ARM) that is not supported by the upstream distribution.

== History ==
The first official Alpha release was made available on February 12, 2012.

== Releases ==
Version	Release date	System	Kernel	Features
RedSleeve 7.4–1.1	March 17, 2013	Raspberry Pi 2 and 3	4.9.80	SELinux; SSH by default
RedSleeve 7.4–1.0	November 30, 2017	Raspberry Pi 2 and 3	4.9.65	SELinux; SSH by default
RedSleeve 7.4–1.0	November 30, 2017	Raspberry Pi 0 and 1	4.9.65	SELinux; SSH by default
RedSleeve 7.4–1.0 (New Kernel)	December 1, 2017	Odroid XU3 and XU4	4.9.61	SELinux; SSH by default
RedSleeve 7.4–1.0 (Old Kernel)	December 1, 2017	Odroid XU3 and XU4	3.10.106	SELinux; SSH by default

=== Versioning scheme ===
RedSleeve aims to maintain equal versioning with the upstream distribution, both in terms of distribution release numbering and the individual package release numbering. The only exception is with the packages that had to be modified from the upstream release. This is only done to either remove upstream branding as required by the upstream distributions terms and conditions, or to apply additional patches required to make the package build and work on the ARM architecture which at the time of writing the upstream distribution does not support. In such cases, .0 is appended to the package version after the distribution tag.

== Media coverage ==
RedSleeve Linux 6 was covered on The Register on May 29, 2012.
