= DreamPlug =

2011 compact plug computer

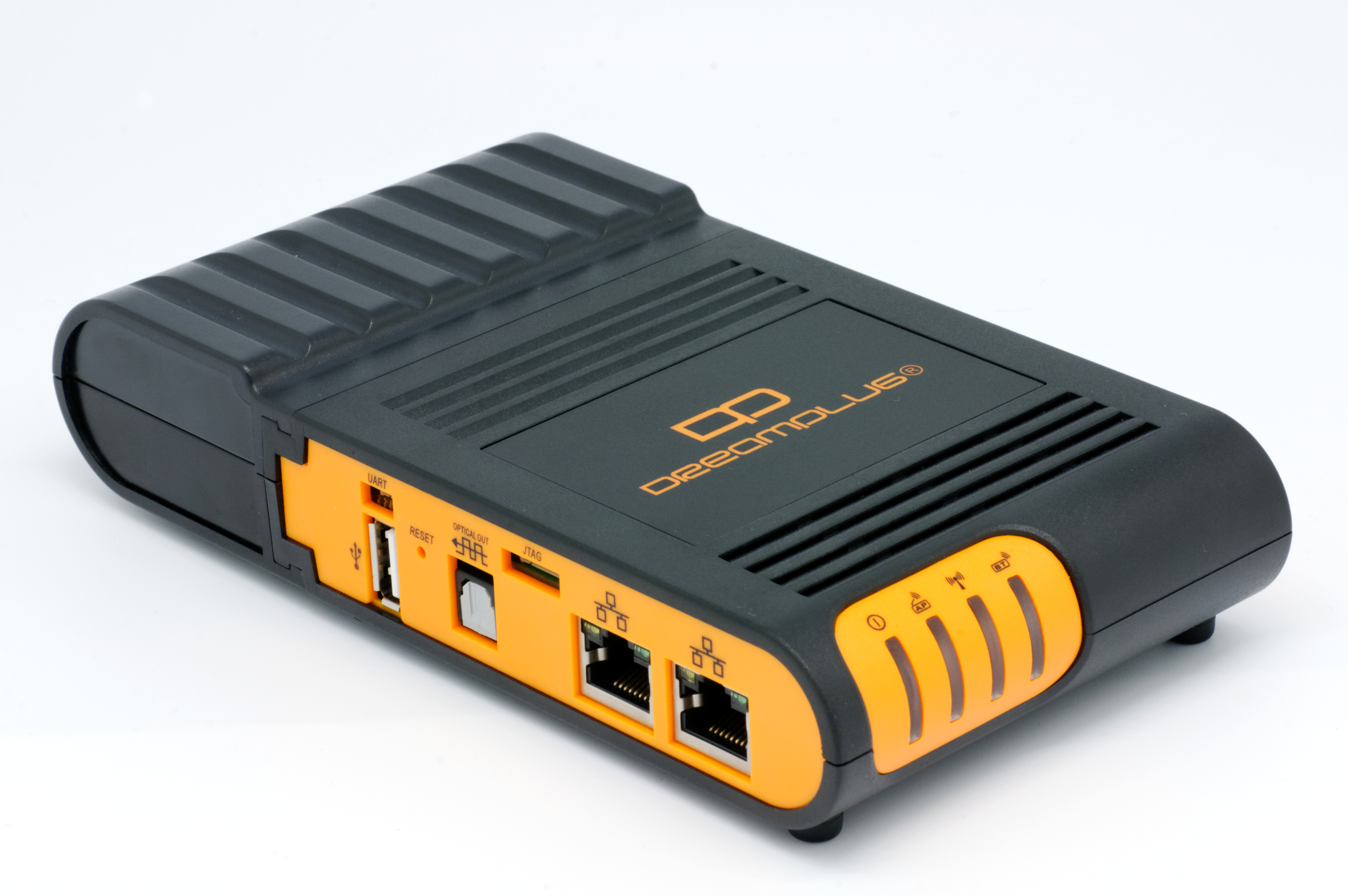
- Manufacturer: Globalscale Technologies
- Type: Plug computer
- Released: 2011
- Operating system: Debian
- CPU: 1.2 GHz Marvell Kirkwood 88F6281 SoC (ARM9E)
- Memory: 512 MB 16-bit DDR2-800 MHz
- Storage: 4 GB on board microSD/External SD/External hard drive
- Display: none
- Connectivity: Dual USB 2.0, Dual Gigabit Ethernet, eSATA 2.0, JTAG, Bluetooth 2.1, Wi-Fi 802.11 b/g(/n), Audio
- Power: 5V 3A
- Dimensions: 120 × 90 × 30 (mm)
- Predecessor: GuruPlug

DreamPlug is a compact and low power plug computer running Debian Linux, based on Marvell's Kirkwood 88F6281 ARM9E SoC. It is intended to be a device that could act as a web server, a printing server or any other network service. It uses micro-SD internal storage and an external Secure Digital slot, but also offers USB ports and a Serial ATA port to connect external disks.

== Improvements over the GuruPlug ==
The DreamPlug is an evolution of the GuruPlug, based on the SheevaPlug platform.

Apart from internal processor changes, the DreamPlug features a new case design, second Gigabit Ethernet, eSATA, SD slot (and internal microSD slot replacing the internal NAND), audio in/out, and a removable PSU.

Early version of DreamPlug has 802.11 b/g Wi-Fi and Bluetooth 2.1+EDR. It is also shipped with 2 GB microSD card. Current version has 802.11 b/g/n Wi-Fi and Bluetooth 3.0. It is also shipped with 4 GB microSD card.

== See also ==
- Plug computer
