= Etón Corporation =

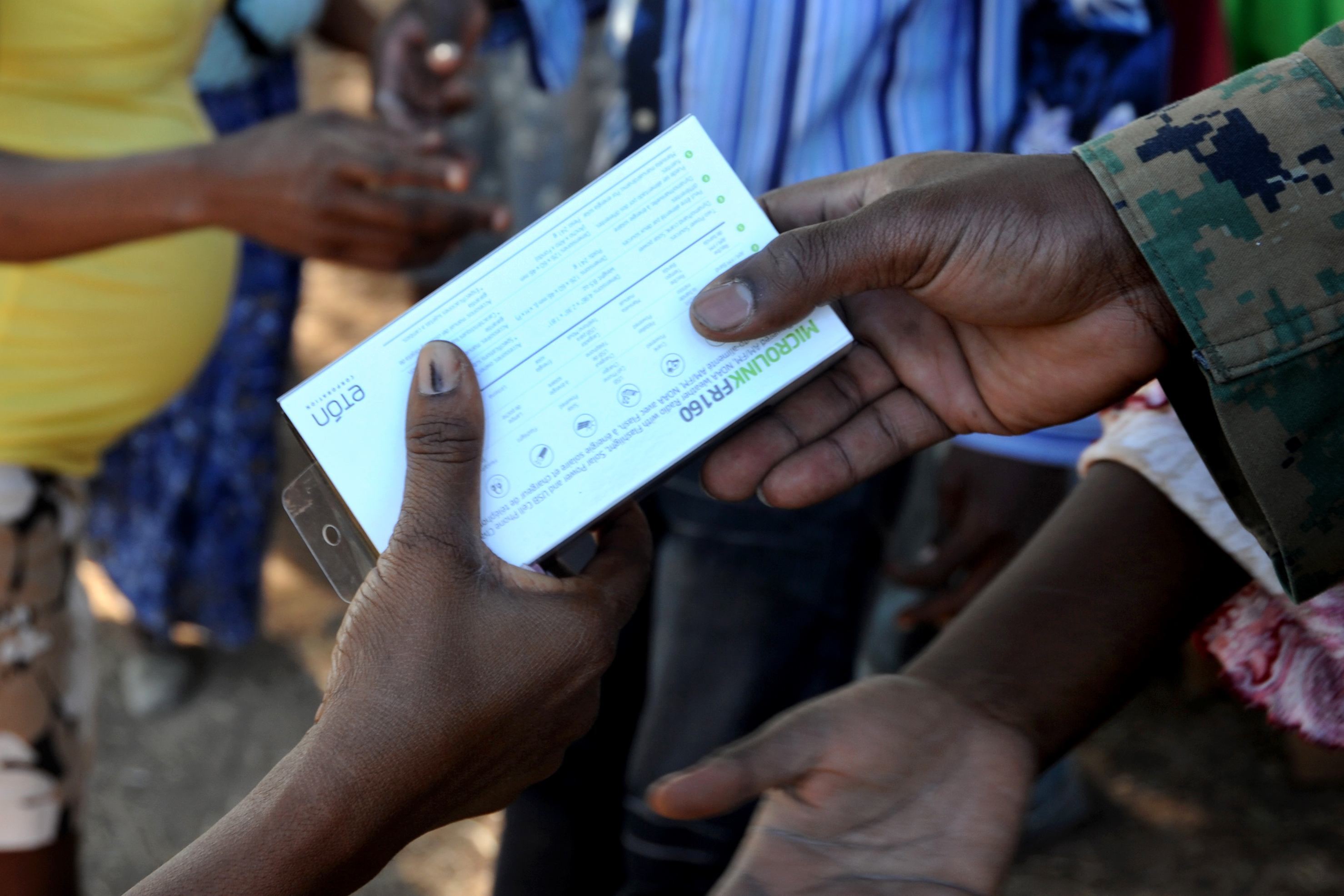
US Marines distribute Eton AM FM radios to Haitians in Port-au-Prince after the 2010 Haiti earthquake.

Eton Corporation is an American company established in 1986 and is based in Palo Alto, California. Formerly known as Lextronics, it produces solar powered and hand-cranked shortwave and emergency radios sold in retail stores and online. It also sells Grundig-branded radios in North America and Europe. Some of its radios are manufactured and branded for the American Red Cross and Canadian Red Cross. The company slogan is Empowered by Nature. It has received a number of awards for these developments and has gained a strong reputation.
