= ArkOS =

Linux distribution

arkOS
- Developer: Jacob Cook
- OS family: Linux (Unix-like)
- Working state: Discontinued
- Source model: Open source
- Latest release: 0.8.1 / October 19, 2016; 10 years ago
- Available in: English
- Package manager: pacman
- Supported platforms: ARM

Support status
- Discontinued

arkOS was a Linux distribution based on Arch Linux, designed primarily for hosting web sites and services on cheap ARM-based devices such as Raspberry Pi, Cubieboard 2, Cubietruck or BeagleBone Black, with plans to expand to other platforms such as x86. It was in operation from 2014 to 2017.

== History ==
Jacob Cook, arkOS's primary developer, originally conceived the idea of arkOS after realizing the extensive amount of time it required to set up his own self-hosted services. He explained it by saying: "I had a good deal of experience with Linux and system administration, but it still took a huge amount of time and research to get the services I wanted set up, and secured properly." Cook aims to reduce dependence from cloud services and make data collection harder.

As of March 2014, arkOS was in its developing stages. The creator of arkOS had also set up CitizenWeb organization, which was responsible for the development of the operating system. CitizenWeb also solicited money through a successful crowdsourcing campaign to finish the platform.

In April 2017 arkOS was discontinued, with the lack of resources as the principal reason. The source code remains available on GitHub.

== See also ==
- FreedomBox
- List of Linux distributions
