= Ambient Weather =

Weather station and software manufacturer

- Type: Private
- Industry: Retail
- Founded: 1998
- Headquarters: Chandler, AZ
- Key people: Chuck Arkell CEO
- Products: Weather Stations
- Number of employees: 9

Ambient Weather is an Arizona based weather station and software manufacturer that specializes in customized products for the home and office, industry, schools, resorts, government and the media.

The company appeared on Inc. Magazine's Top 500/5000 list Honor Roll of fastest growing private companies for five consecutive years (2004–2008), and they were named one of the 500 largest Internet Retailers ranked by annual sales in the United States according to Internet Retailer magazine in 2007.

Their flagship product Virtual Weather Station is a software package for connecting personal computers to weather stations and the Internet, which displays, plots and stores data for monitoring and analysis. They launched a weather station cloud service in 2017. AmbientWeather.net provides live data monitoring, forecasts and weather maps, graphs and historical data, email and text alerts, and API, IFTTT, Amazon Alexa and Google Home integration.

In 2019, Ambient Weather was acquired by Nielsen-Kellerman, a manufacturer of weather stations, ballistics and weather instruments, and sports performance products.
