= Portable data terminal =

Electronic device used to enter or retrieve data wirelessly

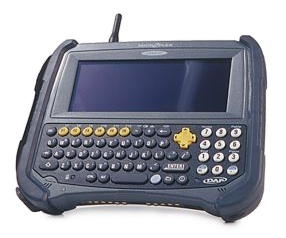
Typical PDT

A portable data terminal (PDT) is an electronic device that is used to enter or retrieve data via wireless transmission (WLAN or WWAN). They have also been called enterprise digital assistants (EDA), data capture mobile devices, batch terminals or just portables.

They can also serve as barcode readers, and they are used in large stores, warehouses, hospitals, or in the field, to access a database from a remote location. Others have a touch screen, IrDA, Bluetooth, a memory card slot, or one or more data capture devices.

PDTs frequently run wireless device management software that allows them to interact with a database or software application hosted on a server or mainframe computer.

Boundaries among PDA, smartphone and EDA can be blurred when comparing the wide array of common features and functions. EDAs attempt to distinguish themselves with a pre-defined requirement for long term constant daily operation (normally allowing a minimum of 8 hours). They seek a higher than normal impact rating / drop test rating and an ingress protection rating of no less than IP54. Most have at least one data collection function, e.g. a barcode or RFID reader.

== Uses ==
Many people including police officers, soldiers, and office workers use it to store data on a long-term scale as it is portable.

== See also ==
- Automated identification and data capture (AIDC)
- Mobile computer
- Mobile data terminal (MDT)
