= NSLU2 =

Network attached storage device

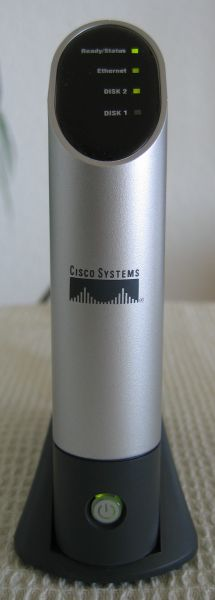
- An NSLU2
- Manufacturer: Linksys
- Type: NAS
- Released: June 15, 2004
- Lifespan: 2004–2008
- Operating system: Linux based
- CPU: 266 MHz ARM Intel XScale IXP420
- Memory: 32 MB SDRAM, 8 MB flash
- Storage: External hard drive/flash disk
- Connectivity: USB, Network
- Power: 5V DC Adapter
- Dimensions: 2.1 x 9.1 x 13 cm
- Weight: 0.2 kg

The NSLU2 (Network Storage Link for USB 2.0 Disk Drives) is a network-attached storage (NAS) device made by Linksys introduced in 2004 and discontinued in 2008. It makes USB flash memory and hard disks accessible over a network using the SMB protocol (also known as Windows file sharing or CIFS). It was superseded mainly by the NAS200 (enclosure type storage link) and in another sense by the WRT600N and WRT300N/350N which both combine a Wi-Fi router with a storage link.

The device runs a modified version of Linux and by default, formats hard disks with the ext3 filesystem, but a firmware upgrade from Linksys adds the ability to use NTFS and FAT32 formatted drives with the device for better Windows compatibility. The device has a web interface from which the various advanced features can be configured, including user and group permissions and networking options.

== Hardware ==
The device has two USB 2.0 ports for connecting hard disks and uses an ARM-compatible Intel XScale IXP420 CPU. In models manufactured prior to around April 2006, Linksys had underclocked the processor to 133 MHz, though a simple hardware modification to remove this restriction is possible. Later models (circa. May 2006) are clocked at the rated speed of 266 MHz. The device includes 32 MB of SDRAM, and 8 MB of flash memory. It also has a 100 Mbit/s Ethernet network connection. The NSLU2 is fanless, making it completely silent.

== User community ==
Stock, the device runs a customised version of Linux. Linksys was required to release their source code as per the terms of the GNU General Public License. Due to the availability of source code, the NSLU2's use of well-documented commodity components and its relatively low price, there are several community projects centered around it, including hardware modifications, alternative firmware images, and alternative operating systems with varying degrees of reconfiguration.

=== Hardware modifications ===
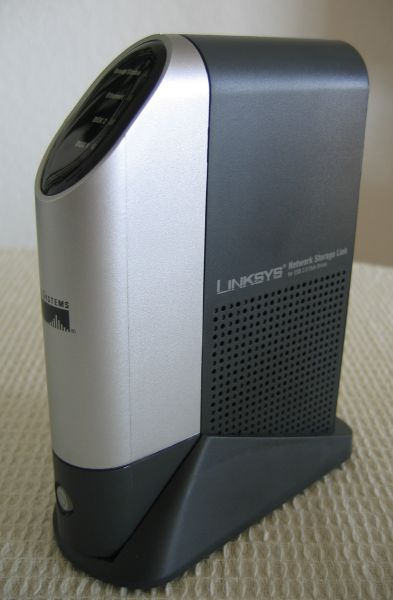
NSLU2 Side View

Unofficial hardware modifications include:

- Doubling the clock frequency on underclocked units. As of summer 2006, the NSLU2 was sold without the "underclocking"
- Addition of a serial port
- Addition of a JTAG port
- Enabling extra USB ports
- Addition of extra memory
  - NSLU2 units that have had their memory upgraded are commonly referred to as 'FatSlugs'
  - Devices have been successfully upgraded to 64 MB but not stable operation with 128 MB and 256 MB of RAM
  - The version with 256 MB RAM and 16 MB flash (twice the standard amount) has been nicknamed 'ObeseSlug'
- Forced Power On
- Adding an HD44780 controlled dot matrix display

=== Alternative firmware ===
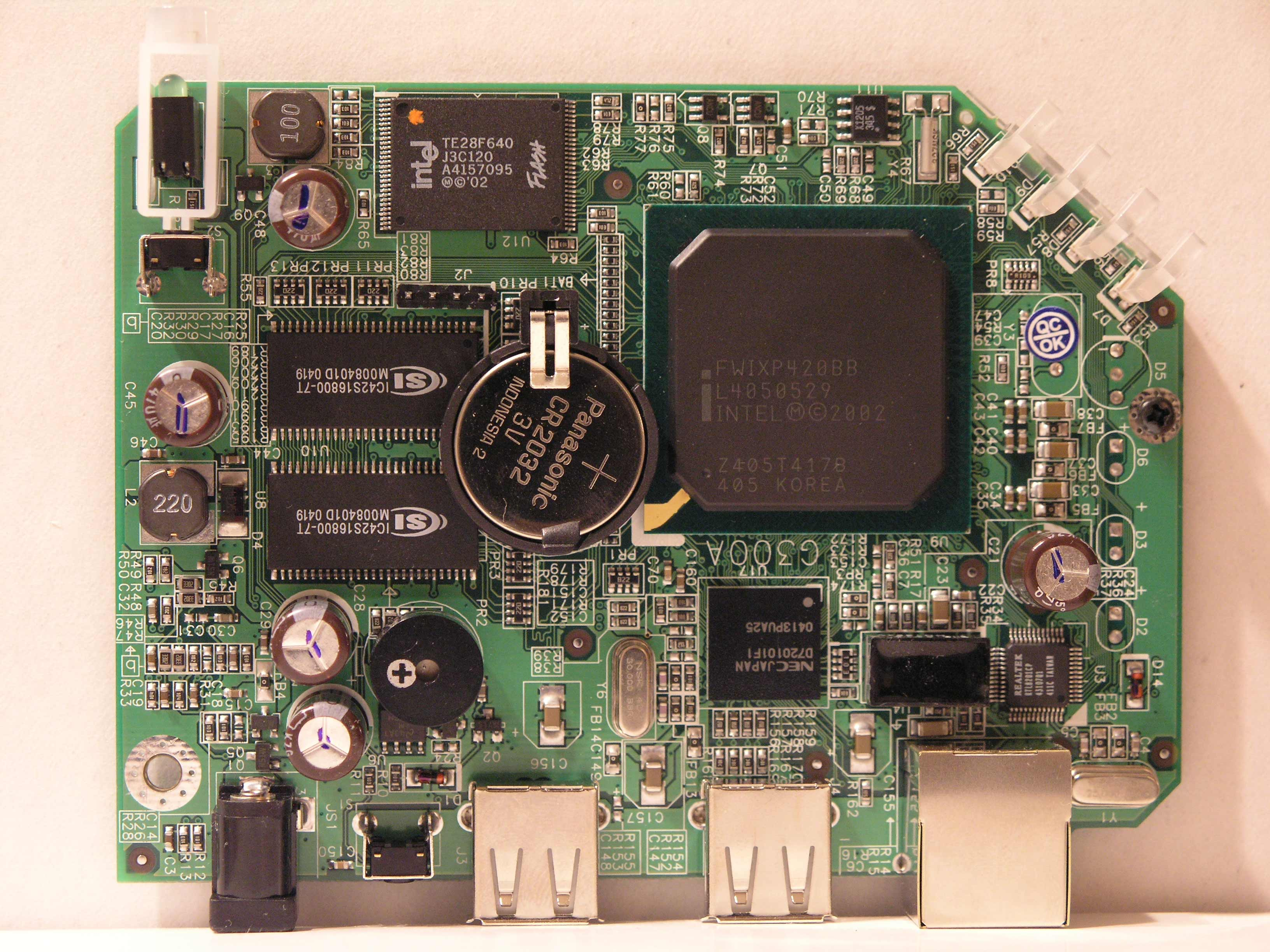
NSLU2 mainboard/PCB

Most of the alternative firmware projects are no longer functional. However OpenWrt claims to still be working to maintain support for the device.

There were two main replacement firmware images available for the device: the first is Unslung which was based on the official Linksys firmware with some improvements and features added. Optware packages were available to expand functionality. The other was SlugOS/BE (formerly OpenSlug), which was based on the OpenEmbedded framework. SlugOS/BE allowed users to re-flash the device with a minimal Linux system including an SSH server to allow remote access. Once installed, the operating system had to be moved to an attached hard disk due to the lack of space available on the flash memory. Once this had been done, a wide range of additional packages were available to be installed from an Internet repository.

It was also possible to run Debian, Gentoo, FreeBSD, NetBSD, OpenBSD, and Ubuntu on the device.

The ability to run an unrestricted operating system on the device opened up a whole new range of uses. Some common uses were a web server, mail server, DAAP server (iTunes), XLink Kai, UPnP AV MediaServers, BitTorrent client, FreeSWITCH, asterisk PBX and network router (with the attachment of a USB network interface/USB modem). German programmer Boris Pasternak developed the weather server program/server Meteohub as an inexpensive way to gather weather sensor data from personal weather stations ("PWS") and allow it to be posted on a number of online weather services including Weather Underground, Weatherbug, Citizens Weather Observation Program (CWOP), and many others.

An NSLU2 with Unslung firmware could be interfaced with a Topfield TF5800 personal video recorder (PVR) to allow an electronic programme guide (EPG) to be automatically downloaded from the Internet and transferred to the PVR.

== Problems ==
- As with most NASs, the device is not immediately compatible with Windows Vista or 7, as it runs an older version of Samba that uses an authentication mechanism that is disabled by default in later versions of Windows. Ways of enabling the older (and less secure) authentication are available.
- The device will not power on automatically when it gets power from an external supply. This might be a problem in an environment where power failures are frequent. Automatic-power-on is possible only with one of several external or internal hardware or wiring modifications.

== Awards ==
The NSLU2 won the "Most Innovative in Networking" Reader Award in the Tom's Hardware 2004 Awards.

== Similar Devices ==
- Buffalo LinkStation
- SheevaPlug
- Belkin Home Base F5L049 (with GPL firmware)

== See also ==
- Buffalo network-attached storage series
