= Free Software Foundation, Inc. v. Cisco Systems, Inc. =

2008 lawsuit in the US District Court for the Southern District of New York

Free Software Foundation, Inc. v. Cisco Systems, Inc. was a lawsuit initiated by the Free Software Foundation (FSF) against Cisco Systems on December 11, 2008, in the United States District Court for the Southern District of New York. The FSF claimed that various products sold by Cisco under the Linksys brand had violated the licensing terms of many programs on which FSF held copyright, including GCC, GNU Binutils, and the GNU C Library. Most of these programs were licensed under the GNU General Public License, and a few under the GNU Lesser General Public License. The Software Freedom Law Center acted as the FSF's law firm in the case. The foundation asked the court to enjoin Cisco from further distributing Linksys firmware that contains FSF copyrighted code, and also asked for all profits that Cisco received "from its unlawful acts." Cisco stated that they were reviewing the issues in the suit, but they believe to be "substantially in compliance".

The FSF contended that code to which it held the copyright was found in the Linksys models EFG120, EFG250, NAS200, SPA400, WAG300N, WAP4400N, WIP300, WMA11B, WRT54GL, WRV200, WRV54G, and WVC54GC, and in the program QuickVPN, which is used to connect virtual private network (VPN) clients via the RV and WRV series Linksys routers.

On May 20, 2009, the parties announced a settlement that included Cisco appointing a director to ensure Linksys products comply with free-software licenses, and Cisco making an undisclosed financial contribution to the FSF.

== See also ==
- OpenWRT
- Free software
