= Optware =

Free Software Package Manager

Optware is a free software package manager for embedded systems. Originally developed as a distribution mechanism for the Unslung Linux distribution for the Linksys NSLU2, Optware has been adopted by a variety of hobbyist communities and device developers.

Optware has been used on a number of platforms, including the webOS community working on the Palm Pre and Pixi, the WL-500g, WL-HDD, WL-500gx, WL-500gP Asus routers, Plug computers (Pogoplug V1, V2, Pro, Biz, Dockstars, etc.), Asustor and Synology NAS devices. In late 2010, the first Optware for Android was released by the Novaports team for the Nook Color.

Optware is no longer maintained. The authors have switched to Optware-ng.

== Supported platforms ==
Optware packages currently run on the following devices:

- Linksys NSLU2 with Unslung firmware
- Asus routers with USB and WL-700gE WL-HDD with Oleg's or OpenWrt or DD-WRT firmware
- Certain Netgear routers with DD-WRT or Tomato firmware
- Asustor on their entire AS-xxxx range
- Synology DS-101, DS-101g+ and DS-101j with custom bootstrapping
- QNAP Turbo NAS
- Maxtor Shared Storage with OpenMSS firmware
- Maxtor Shared Storage II (MSSII) with custom bootstrapping
- Iomega NAS 100d with LudeOS
- Nokia N800/N810 from cs05q1armel feed (install ipkg-opt)
- Freecom FSG-3 with custom bootstrapping
- Palm Pre, Pre Plus, Palm Pixi, Pixi Plus, Palm Pre Emulator and HP TouchPad (with ipkg-opt from Preware)
- Plug computers (Sheevaplug, Pogoplug V1, V2, Pro, Biz, Dockstar, etc.)
- WD TV devices running WDLXTV custom firmware (WD TV Gen 1, WD TV Live, etc.)
- Android devices (Nook Color, etc.)
- e-ink Kindle devices
- TP-Link WR1043nd v1 with DD-WRT firmware
