= SlugOS =

- Developer: NSLU2-Linux Team
- OS family: Linux
- Latest release: 3.10
- Platforms: Linksys NSLU2
- Official website: http://www.nslu2-linux.org

SlugOS is common source base for a group of firmware distributions for the Linksys NSLU2.

== SlugOS ==
SlugOS comprises:

- SlugOS/BE (née OpenSlug) - Big Endian
- SlugOS/LE (née DebianSlug) - Little Endian
- UcSlugC

== SlugOS/BE ==
SlugOS/BE is the Big Endian version of the SlugOS alternative firmware for the Linksys NSLU2.

== SlugOS/LE ==
SlugOS/LE is the Little Endian version of the SlugOS alternative firmware for the Linksys NSLU2.

== See also ==
- Unslung
