= Unslung =

- Developer: NSLU2-Linux Team
- OS family: Unix-like
- Latest release: Unslung 6.10 Beta / December 31, 2007
- Package manager: ipkg
- Supported platforms: Linksys NSLU2
- Kernel type: Monolithic
- Official website: www.nslu2-linux.org

Unslung is an open source firmware for the Linksys NSLU2. It is based on the stock Linksys firmware. Due to the device running Linux, and therefore being licensed under, and subject to the terms of the GNU General Public License, Linksys released the source code.

Unslung takes the Linksys firmware and expands upon it. It is still subject to some of the restrictions that the Linksys firmware has, but also removes some of them. Based on the old Linux 2.4 kernel, support for some newer devices may not exist. The web interface of the default Linksys firmware is kept, fully functioning, except for the upgrade interface.

Through ipkg, users are able to install over 1000 Optware packages to the device. These have been specially compiled for the NSLU2.

== Current Release ==
The Unslung 6.10 Beta firmware is based on the Linksys V2.3R63/A5 firmware. It is a minor bugfix/update of that of Unslung 6.8.

== See also ==
- SlugOS
