= NAS200 =

The NAS200 is a network-attached storage appliance intended for the consumer market. It was originally marketed by the Linksys division of Cisco Systems in 2007.

The NAS200, the successor to the Linux-based NSLU2, has room for two internal SATA drives, a 10/100 Ethernet port, and supports FAT32-formatted external USB 2.0 drives. It comes with UPnP media-sharing software.

The NAS200 is built around a RDC semiconductor R3210-G — a RISC-based System-on-a-chip that executes the Intel 80486 instruction set. The NAS200's stock firmware supports only Microsoft Windows networking (SMB). This firmware includes a Linux 2.6.19 kernel and uses an eCos-based boot loader.

A PC Pro review said "transfer speeds were unimpressive" and found with average read speeds of 3.7 MB/s and average write speeds of 3.2 MB/s. PC Magazine found it a little faster at 4.7 MB/s with 500Gb Seagate drives, but concluded it was too slow for movies.
