= Victor Tsao =

Taiwanese-born American entrepreneur

- 曹英偉
- Born: Ts'ao Ying-wei (Cao Yingwei); 1951 (age 73–74); Taiwan
- Education: Tamkang University (BS); Illinois Institute of Technology (MS); Pepperdine University (MBA)
- Occupation(s): Business executive, hardware engineer
- Known for: Co-founding Linksys
- Spouse: Janie Tsao
- Children: 2 sons

Victor Tsao (born 1951), or Ts'ao Ying-wei (Chinese: 曹英偉; pinyin: Cáo Yīngwěi), is a Taiwanese-American entrepreneur born in Taiwan and hardware engineer. Tsao and his wife Janie co-founded Linksys, a consumer home networking pioneer, and sold the company to Cisco Systems for $500 million in 2003.

== Early life and career ==
Born Ts'ao Ying-wei, Tsao received his bachelor's degree in computer science at Tamkang University in Tamsui, Taiwan. At the university, he met his future wife and business partner, Wu Jian (later known as Janie Tsao), an English literature major.

Janie Tsao moved to the United States in 1975, and a year later, Victor went to Chicago to attend graduate school at Illinois Institute of Technology, where he obtained his master's degree in computer science in 1980. The couple married and moved to California after graduate school. He worked in various computer-related jobs at Montgomery Ward, Kraft Foods, TRW and Taco Bell, and earned a Master of Business Administration (M.B.A.) from Pepperdine University.

== Linksys ==
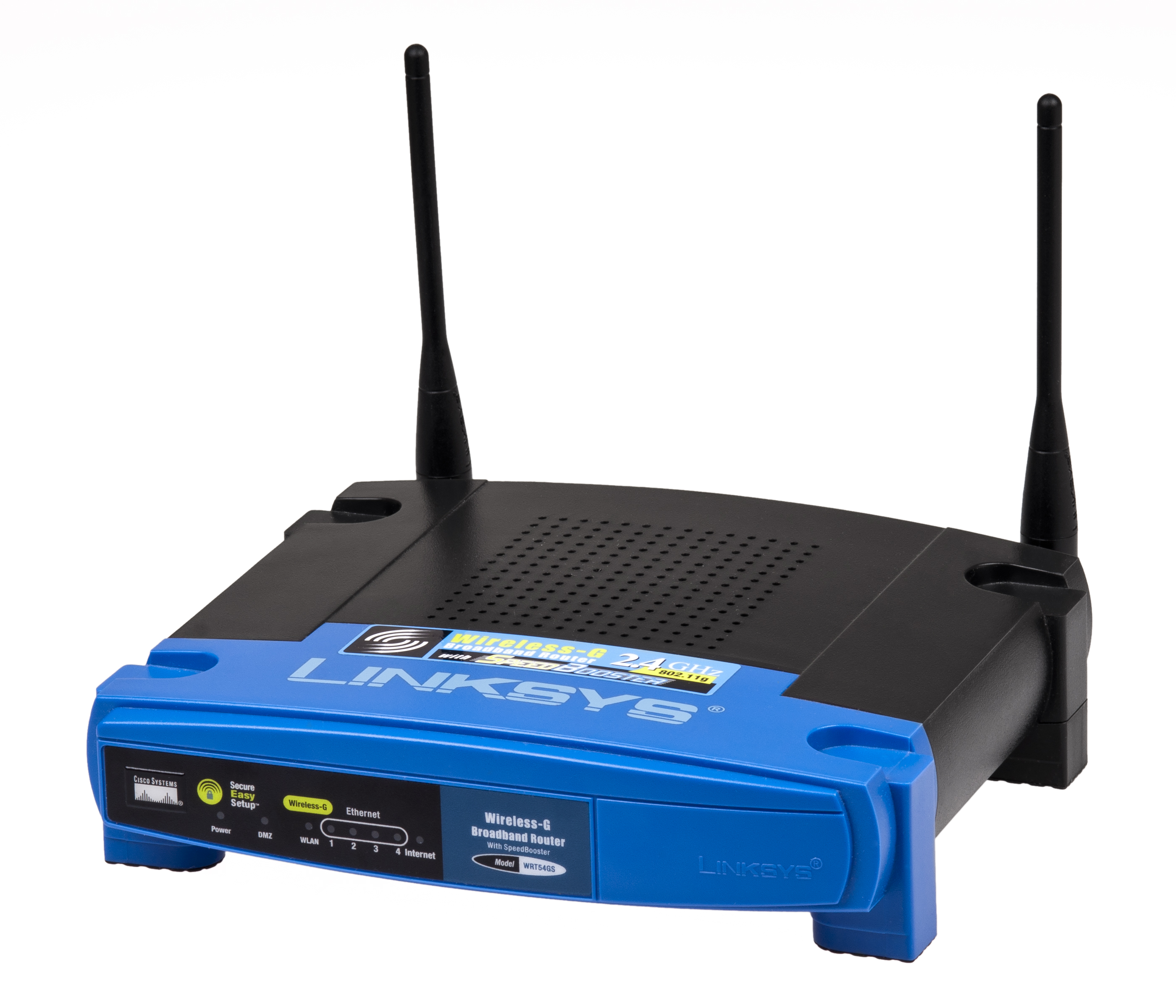
An 802.11g wireless Linksys router

In 1988, the Tsaos had an idea for a product that would allow multiple computers to share a printer. They started DEW International, later renamed Linksys, and financed the company with their own savings. It was founded in the garage of the Tsaos' Irvine, California home. Janie quit her job to run the company full-time. It was a gamble for the couple, who had two toddler sons aged 2 and 4 at the time. The company's product was a moderate success and by 1991, it was generating enough profit to allow Victor to also quit his job at Taco Bell and work on the company full-time.

During the company's early days, Tsao often worked 100 hours a week, involving himself with all aspects of the business. His wife took charge of sales, and was responsible for persuading the major retailers Fry's Electronics and Best Buy to sell Linksys products in 1995 and 1996, respectively. These were crucial breaks for Linksys, quadrupling its revenue to $21.5 million in 1996, and tripling it again to $65.6 million two years later.

In 1999, Tsao developed a $199 broadband router designed for home and small office networks, the first consumer router that cost less than $300. It proved to be Linksys' turning point. Sales increased to $206.5 million in 2000, and tech analyst Steve Baker called Linksys the inventor of consumer home networking. By 2004 the company owned 49% of the networking market, with sales estimated at $538 million.

The success of Linksys attracted the attention of the networking giant Cisco Systems, which contacted the Tsaos in 2002. In March 2003, Victor and Janie Tsao agreed to sell the company to Cisco in a deal valued at $500 million. The following year, the couple was jointly named Entrepreneur of the Year by Inc. Magazine. They continued to work for Cisco as senior vice presidents until 2007, when they retired from corporate life and shifted their focus to Miven Venture Partners, an investment firm they had founded in 2005.

== Family ==
Tsao and his wife have two sons, Michael and Steven. Through the Tsao Family Foundation, they work with the Center for Asian American Media to produce documentaries "promoting understanding and communication."
