= List of Asus routers =

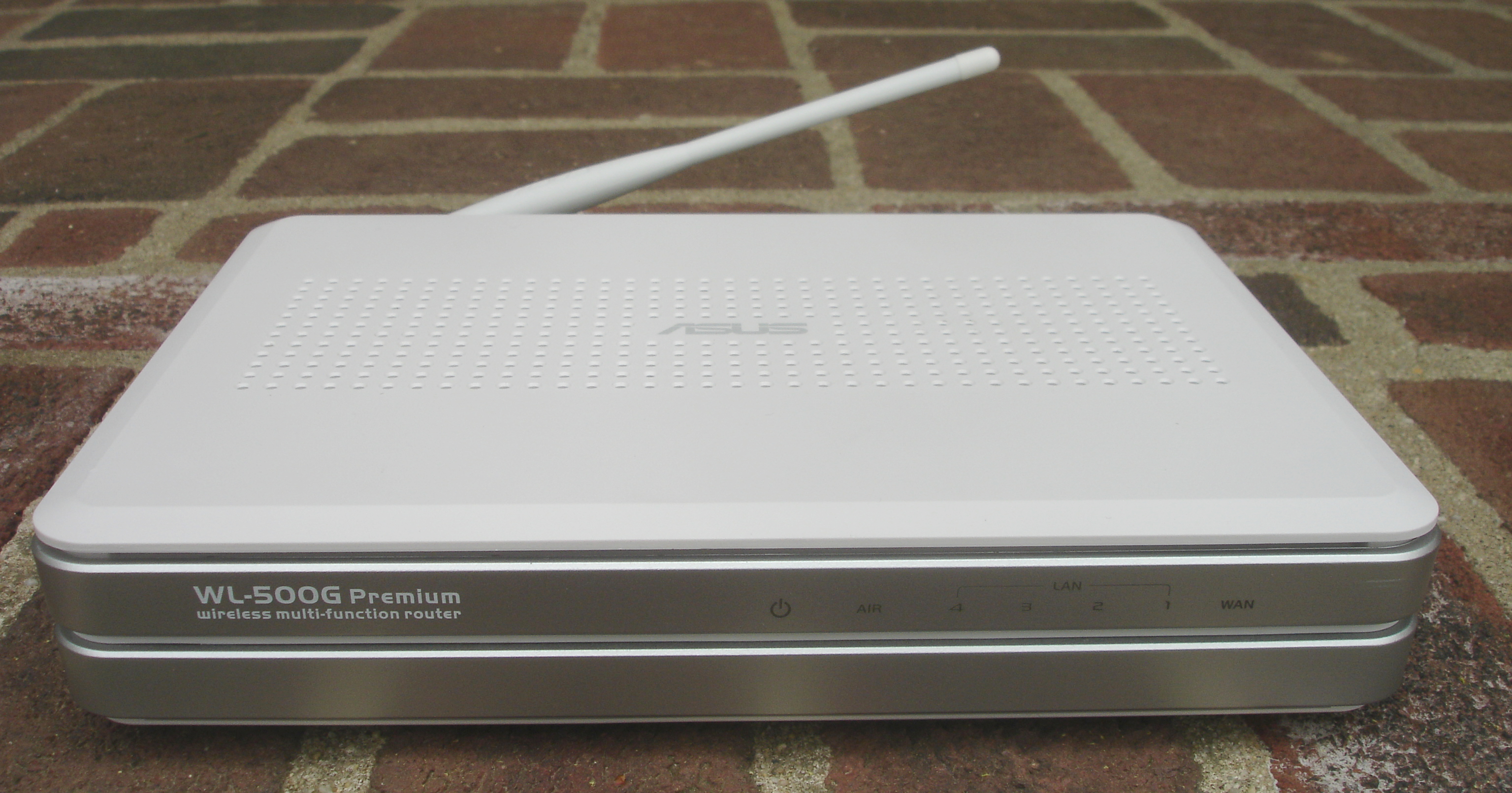
WL-500g Premium front

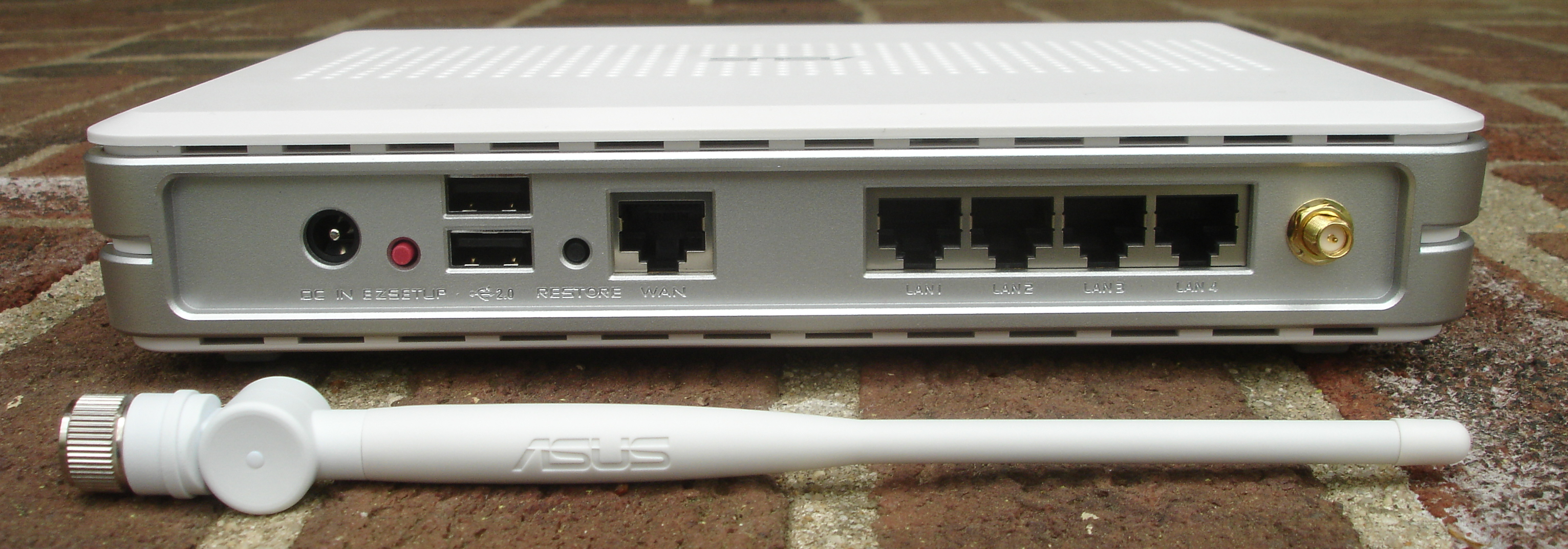
WL-500g Premium rear

ASUSTeK Computer Incorporated (Asus) manufactures a series of network routers directly competing with Linksys routers from Belkin.

The Asus series of routers usually ship with Broadcom chipsets, faster processors and more memory than average, removable antennas, and USB ports for expansion. Although Asus' factory default firmware is generally more feature-rich than its competitors, Open source Linux-based router firmware projects such as DD-WRT, OpenWrt, Tomato Firmware and DebWRT are able to get better performance out of the devices and offer their users more flexibility and customization options. Asus encourages and supports this use and advertises several routers as particularly suitable for DD-WRT including especially the RT-N16 gigabit router. See details on compatibility below. The RT-N13U/B, RT-N12, RT-N10+, WL-520GU and WL-520GC are also advertised as DD-WRT compatible though do not ship with this operating system.

== ASUS Wireless b Routers ==
Model	HW rev	FCC ID	Platform & Frequency [MHz]	RAM [MB]	Flash Mem [MB]	Wireless NIC	WLAN standard [802.11]	mini PCI	Serial port	JTAG port	Ethernet port count	Voltage Input [V/A]	Special features / Notes	Sveasoft firmware version	Min required DD-WRT version	Notes for Running DD-WRT	Min required Tomato Firmware version	Notes for Tomato Firmware
WL-500b	-	MSQWL500B	Broadcom BCM4702KPB (BCM4710) @125 MHz	16	4	Broadcom BCM4301 + BCM2051	b (maybe wlan must be replaced to work)	1	-	1	4 LAN / 1 WAN	5	1 USB, 1 LPT		v23 SP2	initial flash via Asus tool		
WL-500b	V2	MSQWL500B	Broadcom BCM4702KPB (BCM4710) @125 MHz	16	4	RaLink	b (maybe wlan must be replaced to work)	1	-	1	4 LAN / 1 WAN	5	1 USB, 1 LPT		v23 SP2	initial flash via Asus tool		
Model	HW rev	FCC ID	Platform & Frequency [MHz]	RAM [MB]	Flash Mem [MB]	Wireless NIC	WLAN standard [802.11] Max 2.4/5 GHz	mini PCI	Serial port	JTAG port	Ethernet port count	Voltage Input [V/A]	Special features / Notes	Sveasoft firmware version	Min required DD-WRT version	Notes for Running DD-WRT	Min required Tomato Firmware version	Notes for Tomato Firmware

== ASUS Wireless g Routers ==
Model	HW rev	FCC ID	Platform & Frequency [MHz]	RAM [MB]	Flash Mem [MB]	Wireless NIC	WLAN standard [802.11]	mini PCI	Serial port	JTAG port	Ethernet port count	Voltage Input [V/A]	Special features / Notes	Sveasoft firmware version	Min required DD-WRT version	Notes for Running DD-WRT	Min required Tomato Firmware version	Notes for Tomato Firmware
WL-300	1.0	MSQWLAPEWL300	Atmel AT76C510	0.5	?	Intersil HFA3861B	b/g	1	-	?	1 LAN	5	-					
WL-300g	1.40, 1.71, 1.91	MSQWL300G	Broadcom BCM4702 @125 MHz	16	4	Broadcom BCM4306 + BCM2050	b/g	1	-	?	1 LAN	5/2	-					
WL-300g	-	MSQWL300G	Broadcom BCM4710 @125 MHz	16	4	Broadcom BCM4306 + BCM2050	b/g	1	-	?	1 LAN	5/2	-		v23 SP2	initial flash via Asus tool		
WL-330	1.71	MSQWL330	Marwell 88W8500 @?MHz	8	1	Marwell 88W8000	b/g	-	-	-	1 LAN	5/1						
WL-330g	1.22	MSQWL330G	Marwell 88W8500 @?MHz	16	4	Marwell 88W8000	b/g	-	-	1	1 LAN	5/1						
WL-330g	1.30	MSQWL330G	Broadcom BCM4710 @125 MHz	16	4	?	b/g	-	-	1	1 LAN	5/1						
WL-330gE	1.01	MSQWL330GE	Broadcom BCM5354 @240 MHz	16	4	SoC	b/g	-	?	?	1 WAN	5/1			DD-WRT v24preSP2	initial flash via Asus tool		
WL-500g	-	MSQWL500G	Broadcom BCM4702KPB (BCM4710) @125 MHz	16	4	Broadcom BCM4305	b/g	1	-	1	4 LAN / 1 WAN	5	1 USB, 1 LPT	Alchemy, Talisman	v23 SP2	initial flash via Asus tool		
WL-500g Deluxe	-	MSQWL500GD	Broadcom BCM5365 @200 MHz	32	4	Broadcom BCM4306 + BCM2050	b/g	?	1	?	4 LAN / 1 WAN	5	2 USB 2.0 (VT6212L); internal pins:, 3 × GPIO, 2 × serial port (voltage conversion needed), reset	Alchemy, Talisman	v23 SP2	initial flash via Asus tool, tftp, or web interface		
WL-500gP	v1	MSQWL500GP	Broadcom BCM4704 @266 MHz	32	8	Broadcom BCM4318	b/g	1	2	-	4 LAN / 1 WAN	5V/2.5A	2 USB 2.0 (VT6212L)	Alchemy, Talisman	v23 SP3	initial flash via Asus tool		No USB support
WL-500gP	v2	MSQWL500GPV2	Broadcom BCM5354 @240 MHz	32	8	SoC	b/g	-	1	1	4 LAN / 1 WAN?	5V/2.5-3A	2 USB 2.0 (SoC+USB2520)	Talisman	v24 rc7 - build 9264	initial flash via Asus tool	Tomato 1_19_ND	Tomato 1_19_ND works for Broadcom 5354 chipset
WL-520g	-	MSQWL520G	Broadcom BCM5350 @200 MHz	8	2	SoC + BCM2050	b/g	?	?	?	4 LAN / 1 WAN	5	?		v24 micro build 8733	initial flash via Asus tool		
WL-520gC	-	MSQWL520GUGC	Broadcom BCM5354 @240 MHz	16	2	SoC	b/g	?	-	?	4 LAN / 1 WAN	9	-		v24 micro build 8257	initial flash via Asus tool, tftp		
WL-520gU	-	MSQWL520GUGC	Broadcom BCM5354 @240 MHz	16	4	SoC	b/g	?	?	1	4 LAN / 1 WAN	5	1 USB 2.0 (SoC)		v24 build 8257?	initial flash via Asus tool	Tomato 1_22_ND	
WL-550gE	-	MSQWL550GE	Broadcom BCM5352 @200 MHz	16	4	SoC + BCM4320 + BCM2050	b/g	?	-	-	4 LAN / 1 WAN	5	2 USB 1.1 (Requires soldering header)	Talisman	v23 SP2	initial flash via Asus tool		
WL-566gM	-	MSQWL566GM	Realtek RTL8651B	32	4	Airgo AGN303BB	b/g	1	-	-	4 LAN / 1 WAN	5/2	-					
WL-600G	-	MSQWL600G	Broadcom BCM6348 @255 MHz	16	4	Broadcom BCM4318	b/g	-	-	-	4 LAN / 1 WAN	12	2 USB 2.0	-	-	-	-	-
WL-700gE	-	MSQ???	Broadcom BCM4780 @266 MHz	64	2	Broadcom BCM4318E	b/g	-	-	-	4 LAN / 1 WAN	12/3	3 USB 2.0 (VT6212L)	-	-	-	-	-
RT-G32	A	MSQRTG32	Atheros AR2317 @180 MHz	16	4	SoC	b/g	-	-	-	4 LAN / 1 WAN	12/1	-	-	-	-	-	-
Model	HW rev	FCC ID	Platform & Frequency [MHz]	RAM [MB]	Flash Mem [MB]	Wireless NIC	WLAN standard [802.11] Max 2.4 GHz	mini PCI	Serial port	JTAG port	Ethernet port count	Voltage Input [V/A]	Special features / Notes	Sveasoft firmware version	Min required DD-WRT version	Notes for Running DD-WRT	Min required Tomato Firmware version	Notes for Tomato Firmware

== ASUS Wireless n Routers ==
Model	HW rev	FCC ID	Platform & Frequency [MHz]	RAM [MB]	Flash Mem [MB]	Wireless NIC	WLAN standard [802.11]	mini PCI	Serial port	JTAG port	Ethernet port count	Voltage Input [V/A]	Special features / Notes	Min required DD-WRT version	Notes for Running DD-WRT	Min required Tomato Firmware version	Notes for Tomato Firmware
WL-500W	-	MSQWL500W	Broadcom BCM4704 @264 MHz	32	8	Broadcom BCM4321 + BCM2055	b/g/n	1	2	-	4 LAN / 1 WAN	5	2 USB 2.0, Sveasoft Talisman	v24 RC3	initial flash via Asus tool		
RT-G32	B1	MSQ-RTG32	Ralink RT3050F (rev. P2) @320 MHz	16	4 (SPI)	SoC	b/g/n	-	1	-	4 LAN / 1 WAN	12/1	1 USB (Requires soldering header and 5V DC-DC)	-	-	-	-
RT-N10	v1	MSQ-RTN10	Broadcom BCM5356 @300 MHz	16	4	SoC + BCM4338	b/g/n	-	-	-	4 LAN / 1 WAN	9/1 or 5/1.2	-	-	-	-	-
RT-N10+	B1	MSQRTN10B	Ralink RT3050 @320 MHz	32	4	SoC	b/g/n	-	-	-	4 LAN / 1 WAN	12/0.5	-	-			
RTN10 C1 RTN10+ C1	C1	MSQ??	Ralink RT3050F	16	?	?	b/g/n	?	?	?	4 LAN / 1 WAN	12/0.5	?	?	?	?	?
RTN10+ D1	D1	MSQRTN10PLUS	BCM5356	?	?	?	b/g/n	-	-	1 (J14)	4 LAN / 1 WAN	12/0.5	-	-	Not Supported.	-	-
RT-N10E (RT-N10LX)	v1	MSQRTN10E	Realtek RTL8196C	16	4	Realtek RTL8188RE	b/g/n	-	-	-	4 LAN / 1 WAN	12/0.5	-	-	-	-	-
RT-N10U	v1	MSQRTN10U	Broadcom BCM5357 @300 MHz	32	8	SoC + BCM4329	b/g/n	-	-	-	4 LAN / 1 WAN	12/1	1 USB 2.0	-	-	-	-
RT-N10U BLACK	B	MSQRTN10UB	Broadcom BCM5356	32	8	SoC	b/g/n	-	1	-	4 LAN / 1 WAN	12/1	1 USB 2.0	v24 presp2 (build 21061)	initial flash via Asus tool	Tomato Firmware 1.28 by shibby	initial flash via Asus tool
RT-N11	-	MSQRTN11	RDC-3211 (AMRISC 20010)	8	2	Realtek RT2760 + RT2720	b/g/n	1	-	-	4 LAN / 1 WAN	5/1.2	-	N/A	Not Supported	-	-
RT-N12	v1	MSQ-RTN12	Broadcom BCM4716 @300 MHz	32	4	SoC + BCM4329	b/g/n	-	-	1	4 LAN / 1 WAN	9/?,12/1	-	-	-	-	-
RT-N12	B1	MSQ-RTN12B	Broadcom BCM5357 @300 MHz	32	8	SoC + BCM4329	b/g/n	-	-	-	4 LAN / 1 WAN	9/1	-	-	-	Shibby RT	-
RT-N12	C1	MSQ-RTN12C	Broadcom BCM5357	32	8	SoC	b/g/n	-	-	-	4 LAN / 1 WAN	9/1	-	-	-	?	-
RT-N12	D1	MSQ-RTN12D	Broadcom	32	8	SoC	b/g/n	-	-	-	4 LAN / 1 WAN	12/0.5	-	-	-	Shibby RT	-
RT-N12E (RT-N12LX)	v1	MSQRTN12E	Realtek RTL8196C	16	4	Realtek RTL8192CE	b/g/n	-	-	-	4 LAN / 1 WAN	12/0.5	-	-	-	-	-
RT-N13	-	MSQ-RTN13	Ralink RT2880F @266 MHz	32	4	Ralink RT2820L	b/g/n	-	-	-	4 LAN / 1 WAN	12/?,5/2.5	-	-	-	-	-
RT-N13U	v1	MSQ-RTN13U	Ralink RT3052F @384 MHz	32	4	SoC	b/g/n	-	-	-	4 LAN / 1 WAN	12/1	1 USB 2.0	-	initial flash via Asus tool	-	-
RT-N13U	B1	MSQ-RTN13U	Ralink RT3052F @384 MHz	64	8	-	b/g/n	-	-	-	4 LAN / 1 WAN	12/1	1 USB 2.0	-	initial flash via Asus tool	-	-
RT-N14U	C1	MSQ-RTN14U	MediaTek MT7620N @ 600 MHz	64	16	-	b/g/n	-	-	-	4 LAN / 1 WAN	12/1	1 USB 2.0	-	-	-	-
RT-N15	-	MSQ-RTN15	Ralink RT2880F @266 MHz	32	4	Ralink RT2820L	b/g/n	-	-	-	4 LAN / 1 WAN Gigabit	5/2.5	-	-	-	-	-
RT-N15U	-	MSQ-RTN15U	Broadcom BCM5357 @500 MHz	64	8	SoC	b/g/n	-	1 (J2)	1 (J3)	4 LAN / 1 WAN Gigabit	12/1	1 USB 2.0	-	-	-	-
RT-N16	-	MSQRTN16	Broadcom BCM4718 @480 / 533* MHz	128	32	SoC + BCM4329 + BCM2050	b/g/n	1*	1	1	4 LAN / 1 WAN Gigabit	12/1.25	2 USB 2.0	-	for initial flash Asus RT-N16 now supported	1.27 beta teddy_bear build	use Asus Firmware Restoration Utility or load DD-WRT first
RT-N18U	-	MSQ-RTN18U	Broadcom BCM47081 @800 MHz	256	128	Broadcom BCM4360	b/g/n				4 LAN / 1 WAN Gigabit		1 USB 3.0, 1 USB 2.0	-	-	-	-
RT-N53	-	MSQ-RTN53	Broadcom BCM5358 @300 MHz	32	8	SoC	a/b/g/n 300/300 Mbps	-	-	-	4 LAN / 1 WAN	12/1	Dual-band 2.4/5 GHz, 5 GHz chip connected with USB to SoC	-	-	-	-
RT-N53	A1	MSQ-RTN53	Broadcom BCM5357 @500 MHz	32	8	SoC	a/b/g/n 300/300 Mbps	-	-	-	4 LAN / 1 WAN	12/1	Dual-band 2.4/5 GHz, 5 GHz chip connected with USB to SoC	-	-	Shibby v114, use special 114-RT-N53 build	QoS might be yet unstable
RT-N56U	-	MSQ-RTN56U	Ralink RT3662 @500 MHz	128	8	SoC	a/b/g/n 300/300 Mbps	-	1		4 LAN / 1 WAN Gigabit	19/1.58	2 USB 2.0, Dual-band 2.4/5 GHz	-	-	-	-
RT-N65U	-	MSQ-RTN65U	Ralink RT3883 @500 MHz	128	16	Ralink RT3883 (for an) + RT3352 (for bgn)	a/b/g/n 300/450 Mbps	-	-	-	4 LAN / 1 WAN Gigabit	19/1.58	2 USB 3.0, Dual-band 2.4/5 GHz, IPv6, Dual CPU, HW NAT	-	-	-	-
RT-N66U	B1	MSQ-RTN66U	Broadcom BCM4706 @600 MHz	256	32	Broadcom BCM4331	a/b/g/n 450/450 Mbps	-	-	-	4 LAN / 1 WAN Gigabit	19/1.58	2 USB 2.0, Dual-band 2.4/5 GHz, IPv6, USB tethering over 3G/WiMax modem	EKO V24 build 18946	Initial flash via recovery mode (guide)	-	-
RT-N76U (cancelled)	-	-	Broadcom BCM4748 @480 MHz	128	32	Broadcom	a/b/g/n	-	-	-	4 LAN / 1 WAN	-	2 USB 2.0	-	-	-	-
Model	HW rev	FCC ID	Platform & Frequency [MHz]	RAM [MB]	Flash Mem [MB]	Wireless NIC	WLAN standard [802.11] Max 2.4/5 GHz	mini PCI	Serial port	JTAG port	Ethernet port count	Voltage Input [V/A]	Special Features / Notes	Min required DD - WRT version	Notes for Running DD-WRT	Min required Tomato Firmware version	Notes for Tomato Firmware

== ASUS Wireless ac Routers ==
Model	HW rev / (DeviWiki)	FCC ID	Platform & Frequency [MHz]	RAM [MB]	Flash Mem [MB]	Nvram [KB]	Wireless NIC	WLAN standard [802.11]	AC spec	Ethernet port count	Voltage Input [V/A]	Special features / Notes	Merlin Firmware support	Padavan Firmware version	Min required DD-WRT version	Notes for Running DD-WRT	Min required Tomato version	Notes for Tomato Firmware
RT-AC51U	/ (WD)	MSQ-RTAC51U	MediaTek MT7620A @580 MHz	64	16		MediaTek MT7610E	abgn/ac 300/433; Mbit/s	AC750	4x FE LAN / 1x FE WAN	12 VDC / 1A	1x USB 2.0, Dual band 2.4/5 GHz, IPv6	-	Padavan; 3.4.3.9-096	-	-	-	-
RT-AC52U	(CP) / (WD)	MSQ-RTAC52U	MediaTek MT7620A @580 MHz	128	128		MediaTek MT7610E	abgn/ac 300/433 Mbit/s	AC750	4x FE LAN / 1x FE WAN	12 VDC / 1A	1x USB 2.0, Dual-band 2.4/5 GHz, IPv6	-	(UBI*)	-	-	-	-
RT-AC53U	/ (WD)	MSQ-RTAC53U	Broadcom BCM5358U @500 MHz	64	16		Broadcom BCM43526	abgn/ac 300/867 Mbit/s	AC1200	4x FE LAN / 1x FE WAN	12 VDC / 1.5 A	1x USB 2.0, Dual-band 2.4/5 GHz, IPv6, 2T2R	-	-	-	-	-	-
RT-AC54U	(N) / (WD)	MSQ-RT1D00	MediaTek MT7620A @580 MHz	128	16		MediaTek MT7612E	abgn/ac 300/867 Mbit/s	AC1200	4x FE LAN / 1x FE WAN	12 VDC / 1 A	1x USB 2.0, Dual-band 2.4/5 GHz, IPv6	-	Padavan; 3.4.3.9-096	-	-	-	-
RT-AC55U	(HP) / (WD)	MSQ-RTAC55U	Qualcomm Atheros QCA9557 @720 MHz	128	128		Qualcomm Atheros QCA9882	abgn/ac 300/867 Mbit/s	AC1200	4x GbE LAN / 1x GbE WAN	12 VDC / 2 A	1x USB 3.0, 1x USB 2.0, Dual-band 2.4/5 GHz, IPv6, 2T2R	-	-	-	-	-	-
RT-AC56U	(S) / (WD)	MSQ-RTAC56U	Broadcom BCM4708 @800 MHz; Dual core	256	128	64	Broadcom BCM4352	abgn/ac 300/867 Mbit/s	AC1200	4x GbE LAN / 1x GbE WAN	19 VDC / 1.75 A	1x USB 3.0, 1x USB 2.0, Dual band 2.4/5 GHz, IPv6, 2x2	EoL 384.6	-	-	DD-WRT firmware support	-	-
RT-AC58U	WD	MSQ-RTAC58U	Qualcomm IPQ4018 @710 MHz	128	128		Qualcomm IPQ4018	abgn/ac 400/867 Mbit/s	AC1300	4x GbE LAN / 1x GbE WAN	12VDC / 1.5A	1x USB 3.0	-	-	-	-	-	-
RT-AC59U	(WD)	MSQ-RTACRH01	Qualcomm QCN5502 @775 MHz	128	16		Qualcomm QCN5502; QCA9888	abgn/ac 600/867 Mbit/s	AC1500	4x GbE LAN / 1x GbE WAN	12VDC / 1.5A	1x USB 2.0, Dual-band 2.4/5 GHz, MU-MIMO	-	-	-	-	-	-
RT-AC59U-V2	-/-			128	32			abgn/ac 600/867 Mbit/s	AC1500	4x GbE LAN / 1x GbE WAN	12VDC / 1.5A	1x USB 2.0, Dual-band 2.4/5 GHz, MU-MIMO	-	-	-	-	-	-
RT-AC65P			MediaTek MT7621AT @880 MHz	256	128		MediaTek MT7615N	abgn/ac 450/1300 Mbit/s	AC1750	4x GbE LAN / 1x GbE WAN	12 VDC / 2.5A	1x USB 3.0, Dual band 2.4/5 GHz, MU-MIMO, IPv6						
RT-AC66U	/ (WD)	MSQ-RTAC66U	Broadcom BCM4706 @600 MHz	256	128	64	Broadcom BCM4360	abgn/ac 450/1300 Mbit/s	AC1750	4x GbE LAN / 1x GbE WAN	19 VDC / 1.58 A	2x USB 2.0, Dual band 2.4/5 GHz, IPv6, 3x3:3	EoL 380.70	-	V24 build 21061	DD-WRT firmware support	Shibby K26RT-AC, K26RT-N build 111	-
RT-AC66U B1	/ (WD)	MSQ-RTAC66UB1	Broadcom BCM4708C0 @1.0 GHz; Dual core	256	128	64	Broadcom BCM4360	abgn/ac 450/1300 Mbit/s	AC1750	4x GbE LAN / 1x GbE WAN	19 VDC / 1.58 A	1x USB 3.0, 1x USB 2.0, Dual band 2.4/5 GHz, IPv6, Antenna 3x3:3, USB tethering over 3G/4G modem	Yes		RT-AC68U 12-14-2017 -r34080	DD-WRT firmware support	3.1-132	Tomato 3.5-140
RT-AC68U	(P) / (WD)	MSQ-RTAC68U	Broadcom BCM4708 @800 MHz; Dual core	256	128	64	Broadcom BCM4360	abgn/ac 600/1300 Mbit/s	AC1900	4x GbE LAN / 1x GbE WAN	19 VDC / 1.75 A	1x USB 3.0, 1x USB 2.0, Dual band 2.4/5 GHz, IPv6, Antenna 3x3:3, USB tethering over 3G/4G modem	Yes	-	23.05.0 Build	DD-WRT firmware support	-	-
RT-AC86U	WD	MSQ-RTACHN00	BCM4906 @1.8 GHz; Dual core	512	256	128	Broadcom BCM4366E	abgn/ac 750/2167 Mbit/s	AC2900	4x GbE LAN / 1x GbE WAN	19 VDC / 1.75 A	1x USB 3.0, 1x USB 2.0, Dual band 2.4/5 GHz, 2.4 GHz 3x3:3, 5 GHz 4x4:4, IPv6, MU-MIMO	Yes	-	-	-	-	-
RT-AC87U	/ (WD)	MSQ-RTAC87U	Broadcom BCM4709 @1.0 GHz; Dual core	256	128	64	Quantenna QSR1000	abgn/ac 600/1700 Mbit/s	AC2400	4x GbE LAN / 1x GbE WAN	19 VDC / 2.37 A	1x USB 3.0, 1x USB 2.0, Dual band 2.4/5 GHz, IPv6, Antenna 4x4:4	EoL 384.13_10	-	-	DD-WRT firmware support	-	-
RT-AC1200HP	HP / (WD)	MSQ-RT1D00	MediaTek MT7620A @580 MHz	128	16		MediaTek MT7612E	abgn/ac 300/867 Mbit/s	AC1200	4x FE LAN / 1x GbE WAN	12 VDC / 1 A	1x USB 2.0, Dual-band; 2.4/5 GHz, IPv6	-	Padavan; 3.4.3.9-096	-	-	-	-
RT-AC3200	/ (WD)	MSQ-RT0M00	Broadcom BCM4709 @1.0 GHz; Dual core	256	128	64	Broadcom BCM43602	abgn/ac 600/ 2x 1300; Mbit/s	AC3200	4x GbE LAN / 1x GbE WAN	19 VDC / 2.37 A	1x USB 3.0, 1x USB 2.0, Tri-band 2.4/5 GHz, IPv6, Antenna 3x3:3, USB tethering over 3G/4G modem	EoL 384.13_10	-	-	-	-	-
RT-AC88U	WD	MSQ-RTGW00	BCM4709C0 @1.4 GHz Dual core	512	128	128	Broadcom BCM4366	abgn/ac 1000/2167 Mbit/s	AC3100	8x GbE LAN / 1x GbE WAN	19 VDC / 2.37 A	1x USB 3.0, 1x USB 2.0, Dual-band 2.4/5 GHz, IPv6, Link Aggregation (802.3ad), MU-MIMO	Yes	-	-	-	-	-
RT-AC3100	WD	MSQ-RTGW00	BCM47094 @1.4 GHz Dual core	512	128	128	Broadcom BCM4366	abgn/ac 1000/2167 Mbit/s	AC3100	4x GbE LAN / 1x GbE WAN	19 VDC / 2.37 A	1x USB 3.0, 1x USB 2.0, Dual-band 2.4/5 GHz, IPv6, Link Aggregation, MU-MIMO	Yes	-	-	-	-	-
RT-AC5300	WD	MSQ-RTGZ00	BCM4709C0 @1.4 GHz Dual core	512	128	128	Broadcom BCM4366	abgn/ac 1000/ 2x 2167; Mbit/s	AC5300	4x GbE LAN / 1x GbE WAN	19 VDC / 3.42 A		Yes	-	-	-	-	-
GT-AC2900	WD	MSQ-RTACHN00	BCM4906 @1.8 GHz; Dual core	512	256	128	Broadcom BCM4366E	abgn/ac 750/2167 Mbit/s	AC2900	4x GbE LAN / 1x GbE WAN	19 VDC / 1.75 A	1x USB 3.0, 1x USB 2.0, Dual band 2.4/5 GHz, 2.4 GHz 3x3:3, 5 GHz 4x4:4, IPv6, MU-MIMO	Yes	-	-	-	-	-
GT-AC5300	WD	MSQ-RTG03H	BCM4908 @1.8 GHz Quad core	1024	256		Broadcom BCM4366E	abgn/ac 1000/ 2x 2167; Mbit/s	AC5300	8x GbE LAN / 1x GbE WAN	19 VDC / 3.42 A	2x USB 3.0, Link Aggregation (802.3ad), MU-MIMO, WTFast	No	-	-	-	-	-
Model	HW rev / (WikiDevi)	FCC ID	Platform & Frequency [MHz]	RAM [MB]	Flash Mem [MB]	Nvram [KB]	Wireless NIC	WLAN standard [802.11]	AC Spec	Ethernet port count	Voltage Input [V/A]	Special features / Notes	Merlin firmware support	Padavan Firmware version	Min required DD-WRT version	Notes for Running DD-WRT	Min required Tomato version	Notes for Tomato Firmware

== ASUS Wireless ax Routers ==
Model	Series	HW rev / (DeviWiki)	FCC ID	Platform & Frequency [MHz]	RAM [MB]	Flash [MB]	Wireless NIC	Front-End-Module	Switch	WLAN standard [802.11]	AX spec	BW [MHz]	Tx / Rx	Ethernet port count	Voltage Input [V/A]	Special Features / Notes	Antenna	VPN Fusion	Merlin Firmware support	DD-WRT Firmware support	Tomato Firmware support
RT-AX53U		WD	MSQ-RTAX8E00	Mediatek MT7621AT @0.88 GHz Dual core	256	128	2.4/5GHz MediaTek; MT7905DAN/ MT7975DN		Mediatek MT7621AT	abgn/ ac/ax	AX1800	20/40/80	2.4GHz/2x2; 5GHz/2x2	3x GbE LAN / 1x GbE WAN	12 VDC / 1.5 A	1x USB 2.0; OpenWrt Support	4x External		No		
RT-AX55 （RT-AX1800 Plus/ RT-AX56U V2）		WD	MSQ-RTAX8A00	Broadcom BCM6755 @1.5 GHz Quad core	256	128	Broadcom BCM6755		Broadcom BCM53134O	abgn/ ac/ax	AX1800	20/40/80	2.4GHz/2x2; 5GHz/2x2	4x GbE LAN / 1x GbE WAN	12 VDC / 1 A	-	4x External		No		
RT-AX56U		WD	MSQ-RTAXHY00	Broadcom BCM6755 @1.5 GHz Quad core	512	256	Broadcom BCM6755	2.4GHz; Skyworks; SKY85331-11; 5GHz; Skyworks; SKY85743	Broadcom BCM53134O	abgn/ ac/ax	AX1800	20/40/80	2.4GHz/2x2; 5 GHz/2x2	4x GbE LAN / 1x GbE WAN	12 VDC / 2 A	1x USB 3.1 (Gen 1); 1x USB 2.0	2x External		Yes EoL 388.8_4		
RT-AX58U		WD	MSQ-RTAXJ300	Broadcom BCM6750 @1.5 GHz Tri core	512	256	2.4GHz BCM6750; 5GHz BCM43684	5GHz Skyworks; SKY85743	Broadcom BCM6750	abgn/ ac/ax	AX3000	20/40/ 80/160	2.4GHz/2x2; 5GHz/2x2	4x GbE LAN / 1x GbE WAN	19 VDC / 1.75 A	1x USB 3.1 (Gen 1)	4x External		Yes		
RT-AX58U V2		WD	MSQ-RTAX5000	Broadcom BCM6755 @1.7 GHz Quad core	512	256	2.4GHz BCM6755; 5GHz BCM6755	5GHz ?	Broadcom BCM6755	abgn/ ac/ax	AX3000	20/40/ 80/160	2.4GHz/2x2; 5GHz/2x2	4x GbE LAN / 1x GbE WAN	12 VDC / 2 A	1x USB 3.1 (Gen 1)	4x External		Yes (Fork)		
RT-AX68U		WD	MSQ-RTAXIA00	Broadcom BCM4906 @1.8 GHz Dual core	512 Nanya	256 Macronix	2.4GHz BCM6710; 5GHz BCM6710	2.4GHz Skyworks; SKY85331-11; 5GHz Skyworks; SKY85743-21	Broadcom; BCM4906	abgn/ ac/ax	AX2700	20/40/80	2.4GHz/3x3; 5GHz/3x3	4x GbE LAN / 1x GbE WAN	19 VDC / 1.75 A	1x USB 3.1 (Gen 1); 1x USB 2.0; LAN/WAN; Aggregation	3x External		Yes		
RT-AX82U		WD	MSQ-RTAXJ300	Broadcom BCM6750 @1.5 GHz Tri core	512	256	2.4GHz BCM6750; 5GHz BCM43684		Broadcom BCM6750	abgn/ ac/ax	AX5400	20/40/ 80/160	2.4GHz/2x2; 5GHz/4x4	4x GbE LAN / 1x GbE WAN	19 VDC / 1.75 A	1x USB 3.1 (Gen 1)	4x External		Yes (Fork)		
TUF-AX3000	TUF	WD	MSQ-RTAXJ300	Broadcom BCM6750 @1.5 GHz Tri core	512	256	2.4GHz BCM6750; 5GHz BCM43684		Broadcom BCM6750	abgn/ ac/ax	AX3000	20/40/ 80/160	2.4GHz/2x2; 5GHz/2x4	4x GbE LAN / 1x GbE WAN	12 VDC / 2.5 A	1x USB 3.1; LAN; Aggregation	4x External		Yes (Fork)		
TUF-AX5400	TUF		MSQ-RTAX8D00	Broadcom BCM6750 @1.5 GHz Tri core	512	256	2.4GHz BCM6750; 5GHz BCM43684		Broadcom BCM6750	abgn/ ac/ax	AX5400	20/40/ 80/160	2.4GHz/2x2; 5GHz/4x4	4x GbE LAN / 1x GbE WAN	12 VDC / 2.5 A	1x USB 3.2 (Gen 1); LAN; Aggregation	6x External		Yes (Fork)		
RT-AX86S			MSQ-RTAXI600	Broadcom BCM4906 @1.8 GHz Dual core	512 Nanya	256 Macronix	2.4GHz BCM6710; 5GHz BCM43684	2.4GHz Qorvo QPF4216B; 2.4GHz Skyworks SKY85331-11; 5GHz Skyworks SKY85743	Broadcom BCM4906	abgn/ ac/ax	AX5700	20/40/ 80/160	2.4GHz/3x3; 5GHz/4x4	4x GbE LAN / 1x GbE WAN	19 VDC / 2.37 A	1x USB 3.2 (Gen 1); 1x USB 2.0, LAN; Aggregation, USB tethering over 3G/4G modem	3x External; 1x Internal		Yes Same as RT-AX86U		
RT-AX86U		WD	MSQ-RTAXI600	Broadcom BCM4908 @1.8 GHz Quad core	1024 Nanya	256 Macronix	2.4GHz BCM6710; 5GHz BCM43684	2.4GHz Qorvo QPF4216B; 2.4GHz->Skyworks SKY85331-11; 5GHz->Skyworks SKY85743	Broadcom BCM4908	abgn/ ac/ax	AX5700	20/40/ 80/160	2.4GHz/3x3; 5GHz/4x4	4x GbE LAN / 1x 1GbE WAN / 1x 2.5GbE LAN/WAN	19 VDC / 2.37 A	2x USB 3.2 (Gen 1); LAN; Aggregation	3x External; 1x Internal		Yes		
RT-AX86U Pro		WD	MSQ-RTAXI600	Broadcom BCM4912 @2.0 GHz Quad core	1024 Nanya	256 Macronix	2.4GHz BCM6710; 5GHz BCM6715	2.4GHz Qorvo QPF4216B; 2.4GHz Skyworks SKY85331-11; 5GHz Skyworks SKY85743	Broadcom BCM4912	abgn/ ac/ax	AX5700	20/40/ 80/160	2.4GHz/3x3; 5GHz/4x4	4x GbE LAN / 1x 1GbE WAN / 1x 2.5GbE LAN/WAN	19 VDC / 2.37 A	1x USB 3.2 (Gen 1); 1x USB 2.0; LAN; Aggregation	3x External; 1x Internal		Yes		
TUF-AX4200	TUF	WD	MSQ-RTAX5S00	MediaTek MT7986AV @2.0 GHz Quad core	512	256	2.4/5GHz MediaTek; MT7976DA		MediaTek MT7531AE	abgn/ ac/ax	AX4200	20/40/ 80/160	2.4GHz/2x2; 5GHz/3x3		12 VDC / 2.5 A	1x USB 3.2; OpenWrt Support	4x External				
TUF-AX6000	TUF	WD	MSQ-RTAX6700	MediaTek MT7986AV @2.0 GHz Quad core	512	256	2.4GHz MT7976GN; 5GHz MT7976AN		MediaTek MT7531AE	abgn/ ac/ax	AX6000	20/40/ 80/160	2.4GHz/4x4; 5GHz/4x4		12 VDC / 2.5 A	1x USB 3.2; OpenWrt Support	6x External				
RT-AX88U		WD	MSQ-RTAXHP00	Broadcom BCM49408 @1.8 GHz Quad core	1024 SK hynix	256 Winbond	2.4GHz BCM43684; 5GHz BCM43684	2.4GHz Skyworks SKY85006-11; 5GHz Skyworks SKY85743	Broadcom BCM53134	abgn/ ac/ax	AX6000	20/40/ 80/160	2.4GHz/4x4; 5GHz/4x4	8x GbE LAN / 1x GbE WAN	19 VDC / 2.37 A	2x USB 3.1 (Gen 1)	4x External		Yes		
RT-AX89X		WD	MSQ-RTAX2E00	Qualcomm IPQ8078 @2.2 GHz Quad core	1024	256	2.4GHz Qualcomm QCN5024; 5GHz QCN5054		Qualcomm Atheros QCA8337	abgn/ ac/ax	AX6000	20/40/ 80/160	2.4GHz/4x4; 5GHz/8x8	8x GbE LAN / 1x GbE WAN / 1x 10GbE LAN/WAN / 1x 10Gb SFP+	19 VDC / 3.42 A	2x USB 3.1 (Gen 1); OpenWrt Support B1/B2 revision	8x External				
RT-AX92U		WD	MSQ-RTAX2D00	Broadcom BCM4906 @1.8 GHz Dual core	512	256	2.4GHz BCM4352; 5GHz1 BCM4352; 5GHz2 BCM43684			abgn/ ac/ax	AX6100	20/40/ 80/160	2.4GHz/2x2; 5GHz1/2x2; 5GHz2/4x4	4x GbE LAN / 1x GbE WAN	19 VDC / 1.75 A	Tri-band; 1x USB 3.0; 1x USB 2.0	4x External; 2x Internal		Yes (Fork)		
ZenWiFi AX (XT8)			MSQ-AXHZ00	Broadcom BCM6755 @1.5 GHz Quad core	512	256	2.4GHz BCM6755; 5GHz1 BCM6755; 5GHz2 BCM43684		BCM53134	abgn/ ac/ax	AX6600	20/40/ 80/160	2.4GHz/2x2; 5GHz1/2x2; 5GHz2/4x4	3x GbE LAN / 1x 2.5GbE WAN	19 VDC / 1.75 A	Tri-band; 1x USB 3.1 (Gen 1)	6x Internal		Yes (Fork)		
RT-AX95U		WD	MSQ-RTHR00	Broadcom BCM4908 @1.8 GHz Quad core	1024	256	Broadcom BCM43684		Broadcom BCM43684	abgn/ ac/ax	AX11000	20/40/ 80/160	2.4GHz/? 5 GHz1/? 5 GHz2/?	4x GbE LAN / 1x GbE WAN	19 VDC / 3.42 A	Tri-band; 2x USB 3.1 (Gen 1)					
RT-AX3000		WD	MSQ-RTAXJ300	Broadcom BCM6750 @1.5 GHz Tri core	512	256	2.4GHz BCM6750; 5GHz BCM43684		Broadcom BCM6750	abgn/ ac/ax	AX3000	20/40/ 80/160	2.4GHz/2x2; 5GHz/2x2	4x GbE LAN / 1x GbE WAN	19 VDC / 1.75 A	1x USB 3.1 (Gen 1)	4x External		Yes		
GT-AX11000	ROG	WD	MSQ-RTHR00	Broadcom BCM4908 @1.8 GHz Quad core	1024	256	2.4GHz BCM43684; 5GHz1 BCM43684; 5GHz2 BCM43684		Broadcom BCM4908	abgn/ ac/ax	AX11000	20/40/ 80/160	2.4GHz/4x4; 5GHz1/4x4; 5GHz2/4x4	4x GbE LAN / 1x GbE WAN / 1x 2.5GbE LAN/WAN	19 VDC / 3.42 A	Tri-band; 2x USB 3.1 (Gen 1)	8x External	Yes	Yes		
GT-AXE11000	ROG	WD	MSQ-RTAXJF00	Broadcom BCM4908 @1.8 GHz Quad core	1024 Micron	256 Macronix	2.4GHz BCM43684; 5GHz BCM43684; 6GHz BCM43684		Broadcom BCM4908	abgn/ ac/ax	AXE11000	20/40/ 80/160	2.4GHz/4x4; 5GHz/4x4; 6GHz/4x4	4x GbE LAN / 1x GbE WAN / 1x 2.5GbE LAN/WAN	19 VDC, 3.33 A			Yes	Yes		
RP-AX56			MSQ-RPAX4W00	Broadcom BCM6755 @1.5 GHz Quad core	256	16	2.4GHz BCM6755; 5GHz BCM6755			abgn/ ac/ax	AX1800		2.4GHz/2x2; 5GHz/2x2	1x GbE LAN	-	Only; Repeater or Node	2x Internal	Yes			
GT-AX6000	ROG		MSQ-RTAX5600	Broadcom BCM4912 @2.0 GHz Quad core	1024 Samsung	256 Macronix	2.4GHz BCM6715; 5GHz BCM6715	2.4GHz Skyworks SKY85331-11; 5GHz Skyworks SKY85743	Broadcom BCM4912	abgn/ ac/ax	AX6000	20/40/ 80/160	2.4GHz/4x4; 5GHz/4x4	4x GbE LAN / 1x 2.5GbE LAN / 1x 2.5GbE WAN	19 VDC / 2.37A	1x USB 3.2 (Gen 1); 1x USB 2.0; LAN; Aggregation	4x External	Yes	Yes		
GT-AXE16000	ROG	WD	MSQ-RTAX5D00	Broadcom BCM4912 @2.0GHz Quad-core	2048 Samsung	256 Macronix			Broadcom BCM4912	abgn/ ac/ax	AXE16000				19 VDC / 3.42A	1x USB 3.2 (Gen 1); 1x USB 2.0; LAN; Aggregation		Yes	Yes		
RT-AXE7800		WD	MSQ-RTAXE5H00	Broadcom BCM6756 @1.7 GHz Quad core	512 Micron	256 Micron			Broadcom BCM53134O	abgn/ ac/ax	AXE7800				12 VDC / 3A	1x USB 3.2 (Gen 1)		Yes			
GS-AX5400	Strix			1.5GHz Tri core	512	256				abgn/ ac/ax	AX5400							Yes			
GS-AX3000	Strix			Broadcom BCM6750 @1.5 GHz Tri core	512					abgn/ ac/ax	AX3000							Yes			
GT6	ROG			@1.7GHz Tri core	512	256				abgn/ ac/ax	AX10000										
Model Name	Series	HW rev / (WikiDevi)	FCC ID	Platform & Frequency [MHz]	RAM [MB]	Flash [MB]	Wireless NIC	FEM	Switch	WLAN standard [802.11]	AX Spec	Bandwidth	Tx / Rx	Ethernet port count	Voltage Input [V/A]	Special Features / Notes	Antenna	VPN Fusion	Merlin Firmware support	DD-WRT Firmware support	Tomato Firmware support

== ASUS Wireless be Routers ==
Model	Series	HW rev / (DeviWiki)	FCC ID	Platform & Frequency [MHz]	RAM [MB]	Flash [MB]	Wireless NIC	Front-End-Module	Switch	WLAN standard [802.11]	BE spec	BW [MHz]	Tx / Rx	Ethernet port count	Voltage Input [V/A]	Special Features / Notes	Antenna
RT-BE58U				Broadcom BCM4912 ARM Cortex-B53@2.0GHz/ quad-core	1024	256				abgn/ac/ax/be	BE3600	20/40/80/160	2.4GHz/2x2; 5GHz/2x2	3x GbE LAN; 1x GbE WAN/LAN 1x 2.5GbE WAN/LAN		1x USB 3.2 Gen1	4x External
TUF Gaming BE3600				@2.0GHz/ quad-core	1024	256				abgn/ac/ax/be	BE3600	20/40/80/160	2.4GHz/2x2; 5GHz/2x2	4x GbE LAN; 1x 2.5GbE WAN/LAN		1x USB 3.2 Gen1	4x External
TUF Gaming BE6500	TUF-BE6500			@1.5GHz/ quad-core	1024	256				abgn/ac/ax/be	BE6500	20/40/80/160	2.4GHz/2x2; 5GHz/4x4	3x 2.5GbE LAN; 1x 2.5GbE WAN		1x USB 3.2 Gen1	6x External
RT-BE82U				@2.0GHz/ quad-core	1024	256				abgn/ac/ax/be	BE6500	20/40/80/160	2.4GHz/2x2; 5GHz/4x4	4x 2.5GbE LAN; 1x 2.5GbE WAN		1x USB 3.2 Gen1	4x External
RT-BE86U				BCM4916 ARM Cortex-B53 @2.6GHz/ quad-core	1024	256				abgn/ac/ax/be	BE6800	20/40/80/160	2.4GHz/3x3; 5GHz/4x4	3x 2.5GbE LAN; 1x 2.5GbE WAN/LAN 1x 10GbE WAN/LAN		1x USB 3.2 Gen1 1x USB 2.0 Gen1	3x External 1x Internal
RT-BE88U				BCM4916 ARM Cortex-B53@2.6GHz/ quad-core	2048	256				abgn/ac/ax/be	BE7200	20/40/80/160	2.4GHz/4x4; 5GHz/4x4	4x 10/100/1000 LAN 3x 2.5GbE LAN; 1x 2.5GbE WAN/LAN 1x 10GbE WAN/LAN 1 x 10Gbps SFP+		1x USB 3.2 Gen1	4x External
RT-BE90U				@1.5GHz quad-core	1024	256				abgn/ac/ax/be	BE9400	20/40/80/160/320	2.4GHz/2x2; 5GHz/2x2 6GHz/2x2	3x 2.5GbE LAN; 1x 2.5GbE WAN		1x USB 3.2 Gen1	6x External
RT-BE92U				BCM6765 ARM Cortex-A7 @2.0GHz/ quad-core	1024	256				abgn/ac/ax/be	BE9700	20/40/80/160/320	2.4GHz/3x3; 5GHz/2x2 6GHz/2x2	3x 2.5GbE LAN; 1x 2.5GbE WAN/LAN 1x 10GbE WAN/LAN		1x USB 3.2 Gen1	4x External
ROG Rapture GT-BE25000				@2.6GHz/ quad-core	2048	256				abgn/ac/ax/be	BE25000	20/40/80/160/320	2.4GHz/4x4; 5GHz1/4x4 5GHz2/4x4 6GHz/4x4	1x 10/100/1000 LAN 3x 2.5GbE LAN; 1x 10GbE LAN 1x 2.5GbE WAN/LAN 1x 10GbE WAN/LAN		1x USB 3.2 Gen1 1x USB 2.0 Gen1	8x External
GT-BE98 PRO				BCM4916 ARM Cortex-B53 @2.6GHz/ quad-core	2048	256				abgn/ac/ax/be	BE30000	20/40/80/160/320	2.4GHz/4x4; 5GHz/4x4 6GHz1/4x4 6GHz2/4x4	1x 10/100/1000 LAN 3x 2.5GbE LAN; 1x 10GbE LAN 1x 2.5GbE WAN/LAN 1x 10GbE WAN/LAN		1x USB 3.2 Gen1 1x USB 2.0 Gen1	8x External
RT-BE3600E	RT-BE3600E			Quad-core processor	256	128					BE3600		5GHz 2x2 2.4GHz 2x2	1x 2.5G for WAN, 3x 1G for LAN,			
RT-BE59	RT-BE59			2.0 GHz quad-core processor	1024	128					BE5000		5GHz 3x3 2.4GHz 2x2	1x 2.5G for WAN, 1x 2.5G for LAN, 3 x 1G LAN,			
ProArt Router PRT-BE5000	PRT-BE5000			2.0 GHz quad-core processor	1024	128					BE5000		5GHz 3x3 2.4GHz 2x2	1x 2.5G for WAN, 1x 2.5G for LAN, 3 x 1G LAN			
RT-3600S	RT-BE3600S			Quad-core processor	256	128					BE3600		5GHz 2x2 2.4GHz 2x2	1x 2.5G for WAN, 3x 1G for LAN,			
RT-BE3600HP	RT-BE3600HP			2.0 GHz quad-core processor	512	128					BE3600		5GHz 2x2 2.4GHz 2x2	1x 2.5G for WAN, 4 x 1G LAN			
ROC Rapture GT-BE25000 Edition 20	GT-BE25000			2.6GHz quad-core processor	2048	256					BE25000		2.4GHz 4x4 5GHz-1 4x4 5GHz-2 4x4 6GHz 4x4	1 x 10Gbps for WAN/LAN 1 x 2.5Gbps for WAN/LAN 1 x 10Gbps for LAN 3 x 2.5Gbps for LAN 1 x RJ45 10/100/1000Mbps for LAN 1 x USB 3.2 Gen1 1 x USB 2.0			
ROC Rapture GT-BE98 Edition 20	GT-BE98			2.6GHz quad-core processor	2048	256					BE25000		2.4GHz 4x4 5GHz-1 4x4 5GHz-2 4x4 6GHz 4x4	1 x 10Gbps for WAN/LAN 1 x 2.5Gbps for WAN/LAN 1 x 10Gbps for LAN 3 x 2.5Gbps for LAN 1 x RJ45 10/100/1000Mbps for LAN 1 x USB 3.2 Gen1 1 x USB 2.0			
ROC Rapture GT-BE98 Pro Edition 20	GT-BE98 PRO			2.6GHz quad-core processor	2048	256					BE30 000		2.4GHz 4x4 5GHz 4x4 6GHz-1 4x4 6GHz-2 4x4	1 x 10Gbps for WAN/LAN 1 x 2.5Gbps for WAN/LAN 1 x 10Gbps for LAN 3 x 2.5Gbps for LAN 1 x RJ45 10/100/1000Mbps for LAN 1 x USB 3.2 Gen1 1 x USB 2.0			
ROG STRIX GS7 Pro Max	GS7 Pro Max			2.0 GHz quad-core processor	2048	256					BE12000		2.4GHz 2x2 5GHz-1 4x4 5GHz-2 4x4	1 x Combo 10G SFP+/RJ45 WAN/LAN (Either can be supported at a time) 1 x 10G LAN [2.5G] 1 x 2.5G WAN/LAN 4 x 2.5G LAN 1 x USB 3.2 Gen 1			
RT-BE90U	RT-BE90U			1.5 GHz quad-core processor	1024	256					BE9400		6GHz 2x2 5GHz 2x2 2.4GHz 2x2	1 x 2.5 Gbps for WAN 3 x 2.5 Gbps for LAN USB 3.2 Gen1 x1			
RT-BE9700				2.0 GHz quad-core processor	1024	256					BE9700		6GHz 2x2 5GHz 2x2 2.4GHz 3x3	1 x 10Gbps for WAN/LAN 1 x 2.5Gbps for WAN/LAN 3 x 2.5 Gbps for LAN USB 3.2 Gen1 x1			
RT-BE55				2.0 GHz quad-core processor	512	128					BE3600		5GHz 2x2 2.4GHz 2x2	1x 2.5G for WAN, 4 x 1G LAN			
ROG Strix GS-BE7200X	GS-BE7200X			1.8GHz Tri-core processor	1024	128					BE7200		2.4GHz 4x4 5GHz 4x4	1 x 10G for WAN 1 x 2.5G for LAN 4 x 1G for LAN USB 3.2 Gen1 x1			
ROG Strix GS-BE7200	GS-BE7200			2.0GHz quad-core	1024	128					BE7200		2.4GHz 4x4 5GHz 5x5	1 x 2.5G for WAN 4 x 2.5G for LAN			
TUF Gaming BE9400	TUF-BE9400										BE9400						

== See also ==
- List of wireless router firmware projects
