= Topfield =

South Korean electronics company

Established in South Korea in 1998, TOPFIELD Co., Ltd. is a consumer electronics manufacturer making broadcasting receivers, other video and audio related apparatus. Their main business is making products such as set top boxes (STBs) and personal video recorders (PVRs) to be used with satellite television or digital television. Topfield have never manufactured televisions.

The company has head offices in Bundang, South Korea, and branch offices in Germany and Thailand.

== Personal Video Recorder ==
Topfield produces PVRs for standard- and high-definition television program recording. The PVRs store the digital files in a container-format with the *.REC file extension on their hard-disk drives; Topfield and freeware software is available to transfer these files between a Topfield PVR with USB support and a computer. Some freeware and commercial software recognises this format, and can convert and play files.

Various unofficial alternative versions of operating software with additional features and bug fixes have been made available, and the operation of Topfield PVRs can be substantially modified by installing third-party Topfield Application Programs (TAPs).

== Models ==
A complete list of models is available on the Topfield website

- DBC-5100
- TF-100C Black Edition
- TF-100T Black Edition
- TF400PVRc
- TF400PVRt
- TF500PVRc
- TF500PVRt
- TF550PVR
- TF600PVRc
- TF600PVRt
- TF650PVR
- TF5000 PVRt
- TF5800PVR TF58x0 models are UK Freeview PVRs
- TF5800PVRt
- TF5810PVRt
- TF7100HD PVRt Plus
- TRF-2100
- TRF-2460
- TRF-2400
- TRF-7160
