= Janie Tsao =

American entrepreneur

- 吳健
- Born: Wu Chien (Wu Jian); 1953 (age 71–72); Taiwan
- Education: Tamkang University (BA)
- Occupations: Business executive; hardware engineer
- Known for: Co-founding Linksys
- Spouse: Victor Tsao
- Children: 2 sons

Janie Tsao (born 1953), née Wu Chien (Chinese: 吳健; pinyin: Wú Jiàn), is a Chinese American entrepreneur born in Taiwan and hardware engineer. She and her husband Victor co-founded Linksys, a consumer home networking pioneer, and sold the company to Cisco Systems for $500 million in 2003.

== Early life and education ==
Born Wu Chien (or Wu Jian), Tsao received her bachelor's degree in English literature at Tamkang University in Taiwan. There, she met her future husband and business partner, Victor Tsao. They later married in the United States.

In 1977, Tsao and her husband moved to Chicago, where they attended graduate school. They eventually settled in California.

== Career ==
=== Early career ===
In 1975, Tsao moved to the United States and accepted a position at Sears Roebuck in information technology, where she worked for more than eight years. Later, she worked at TRW and Carter Hawley Hale as a systems manager.

=== Linksys ===
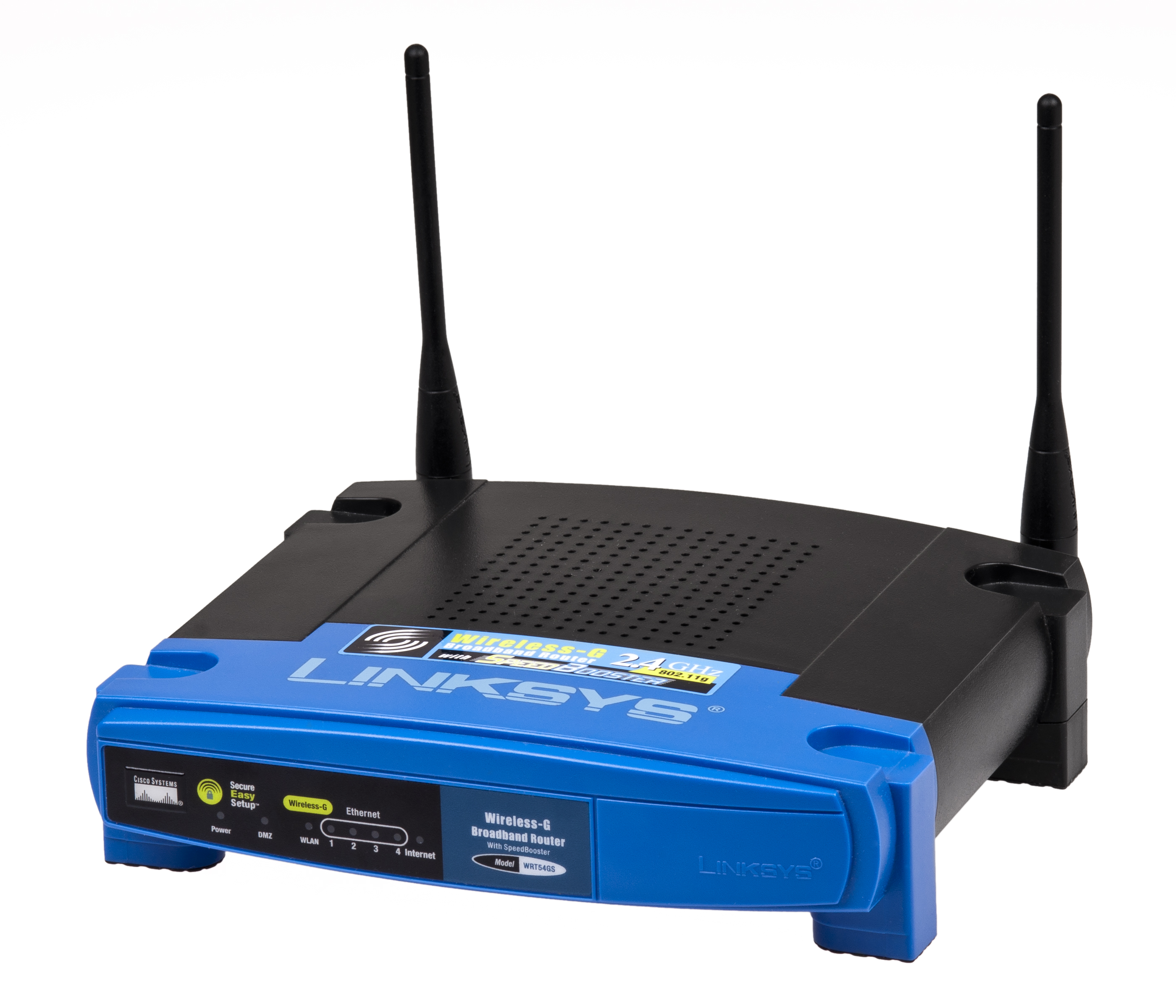
An 802.11g wireless Linksys router

In 1988, the Tsaos had an idea for a product that would allow multiple computers to share a printer. Janie, then 35 years old, quit her job to start Linksys and the couple financed the company with their savings. They founded the company in their garage. The company's first product was a success and by 1991, it was generating enough profit to allow Victor to also quit his job and work on the company full-time.

Janie Tsao took charge of the company's sales, and was responsible for persuading the major retailers Fry's Electronics and Best Buy to sell Linksys products in 1995 and 1996, respectively. These were crucial breaks for Linksys, quadrupling its revenue to $21.5 million in 1996, and tripling it again to $65.6 million two years later. She developed Linksys' retail channel and oversaw the development of the company's distribution, e-commerce and international channel market strategies and programs. She also developed Linksys's broadband strategy, partnering with cable and telecom companies to "provide high-speed Internet sharing access via wired or wireless solutions to PC users across the country."

In 2003, the Tsaos sold the company to Cisco Systems in a deal valued at $500 million. They continued to work for Cisco as senior Vice Presidents and General Manager until 2007, when they retired from corporate life and shifted their focus to Miven Venture Partners, an investment firm they had founded in 2005.

== Recognition ==
In 2000, Tsao was named Entrepreneur of the Year by the Orange County Business Association. In 2002, she was awarded a BridgeGate 20 award. In 2004, Tsao and her husband were jointly named Entrepreneur of the Year by Inc. magazine. She is the 2005 winner of the ABIE Award for Technical Leadership from the Anita Borg Institute.

== Personal life ==
Tsao and her husband have two sons, Michael and Steven. Through the Tsao Family Foundation, they work with the Center for Asian American Media to produce documentaries "promoting understanding and communication."
