= Linksys routers =

Routers by Linksys

Linksys manufactures a series of network routers. Many models are shipped with Linux-based firmware and can run third-party firmware. The first model to support third-party firmware was the very popular Linksys WRT54G series.

The Linksys WRT160N/WRT310N series is the successor to the WRT54G series of routers from Linksys. The main difference is the draft 802.11n wireless interface, providing a maximum speed of 270 Mbit/s over the wireless network when used with other 802.11n devices.

== Specifications and versions ==
=== BEFW11S4 ===
Linksys' first series of wireless routers.

The Linksys BEFW11S4 is a Wi-Fi capable residential gateway from Linksys. The device is capable of sharing Internet connections among several computers via 802.3 Ethernet and 802.11b wireless data links. With only 1 MB of flash storage and 4 MB of RAM, no third party replacement firmware is compatible with it.

=== WRT54G series ===
The Linksys WRT54G and variants WRT54GS, WRT54GL, and WRTSL54GS are Wi-Fi capable residential gateways from Linksys. The device is capable of sharing Internet connections among several computers via 802.3 Ethernet and 802.11b/g wireless data links.

The WRT54GL as well as most (but not all) of the other variants in this series, are capable of running Linux-based third-party firmware for added features. Supported software includes Tomato, OpenWrt, and DD-WRT

=== WRT100 ===
802.11g MIMO router with 100 Mbit/s switches

| Version | CPU speed | RAM | Flash memory | Radio | S/N prefix | Notes |
|---|---|---|---|---|---|---|
| 1.0 | Ralink RT2880 based MIPS32 system with RT2720L radio, ? MHz | ? | 4 MB | 2.4 GHz | MRX0 | No DD-WRT or Sveasoft support because of the Ralink chipset. The specifications for this chipset classify it as supporting draft-N; though Linksys documentation says that it is only a Wireless-G model that works with Wireless-N. |

=== WRT110 ===
802.11g MIMO router with 100 Mbit/s switches

| Version | CPU speed | RAM | Flash memory | Radio | S/N prefix | Notes |
|---|---|---|---|---|---|---|
| 1.0 | Ralink RT2780F chipset with RT2720L as transceiver: 1 transmit, 2 receive (1T2R) | 16 MB | 4 MB | 2.4 GHz | MSU0 | No DD-WRT or Sveasoft support because of the Ralink chipset. The specifications for this chipset classify it as supporting draft-N though Linksys documentation says that it is only a Wireless-G model that works with Wireless-N. Also, factory router configuration and firmware have Wireless-N capabilities and user-configurable options. |

=== WRT120N ===
150 Mbit/s N router, but not as fast as real N speeds, with 100 Mbit/s switches

| Version | CPU speed | RAM | Flash memory | Radio | S/N prefix | Notes |
|---|---|---|---|---|---|---|
| 1.0 | Atheros AR7240-AH1E @ 400 MHz and AR9285-AL1E | 32 MB | 2 MB | 2.4 GHz | JUT0 | No DD-WRT/OpenWrt support yet. Likely won't be supported due to 2 MB flash. See http://www.dd-wrt.com/wiki/index.php/Known_incompatible_devices |

=== WRT150N ===
802.11n "draft" MIMO router with 100 Mbit/s switches.

| Version | CPU speed | RAM | Flash memory | Radio | S/N prefix | Notes |
|---|---|---|---|---|---|---|
| 1.0 | Broadcom BCM4704 chip rev. 9 @ 266 MHz | 16 MB | 4 MB | 2.4 GHz | CQ60 | Sveasoft firmware supports the WRT150N. DD-WRT flashable |
| 1.1 | Broadcom BCM4704 chip rev. 9 @ 266 MHz | 16 MB | 4 MB | 2.4 GHz | CQ61 | Sveasoft firmware supports the WRT150N. DD-WRT flashable |

=== WRT160N ===
802.11n "draft" MIMO router with 100 Mbit/s switches. The E1000 and Cisco Valet M10 replaced this model.

| Version | CPU speed | RAM | Flash memory | Radio | S/N prefix | Notes |
|---|---|---|---|---|---|---|
| 1.0 | Broadcom BCM4704 @ 266 MHz | 32 MB | 4 MB | 2.4 GHz | CSE0 | DD-WRT Flashable. OpenWRT has legacy support for this router. |
| 1.1 | Broadcom BCM4704 rev 9 @ 266 MHz | 16 MB | 4 MB | 2.4 GHz | CSE0 | DD-WRT supports with v24 RC-7 (2008-04-24). OpenWRT has legacy support for this router. |
| 2.0 | Ralink RT2880F @ 266 MHz | 16 MB | 4 MB | 2.4 GHz | CSE1 | DD-WRT currently does not support with this model. Linux also drivers for Ralink chips are still in development due to licensing issues. Firmware 2.0.02 build 11 for these routers is reported to have problems with resolving DNS for wired and wireless clients. Either revert to 2.0.02 build 8 or up to 2.0.03 build 7 This may be a result of the reduced RAM. |
| 3.0 | Broadcom BCM4716 @ 300 MHz | 32 MB | 4 MB | 2.4 GHz | CSE2-CSE5 | DD-WRT supports this version with v24 sp2 – build 13253 Firmware 3.0.02 Build 4 for these routers is reported to have problems with resolving DNS for wired and wireless clients. Firmware 3.0.03 Build 3 was released to resolve DNS issues. |

=== WRT160NL ===
802.11n "draft" MIMO router with 100 Mbit/s switches. Has a Linux-based OS, external antenna, and USB port for network storage. The E2100L replaced this model.

| Version | CPU speed | RAM | Flash memory | Radio | S/N prefix | Notes |
|---|---|---|---|---|---|---|
| 1.0 | Atheros 9130 @ 400 MHz | 32 MB | 8 MB | 2.4 GHz | CUR0 | OpenWrt Kamikaze trunk r17264 & later and DD-WRT v24 preSP2 v24 Build14311 |

=== WRT300N ===
802.11n "draft" MIMO router with 100 Mbit/s switches. Base model for all the others listed below.

| Version | CPU speed | RAM | Flash memory | Radio | S/N prefix | Notes |
|---|---|---|---|---|---|---|
| 1.0 | Broadcom BCM4704 r9 @ 264 MHz | 32 MB | 4 MB | 2.4 GHz | CNP0 | Wireless NIC is a Broadcom Cardbus card with Broadcom BCM4321 Chipset (look Like Linksys WPC300n). The switch is a Broadcom BCM5325 FKQMG. Sveasoft firmware supports the WRT300N. Supports DD-WRT v24 RC-6 (12/29/2007) Standard and newer. Maintained IP Address and many other settings on flash. |
| 1.1 | Broadcom BCM4785 rev 2 at 300 MHz | 32 MB | 8 MB | 2.4 GHz | CNP1 | Has an integrated radio (Broadcom BCM4321) instead of the CardBus card. DD-WRT custom firmware supports this router as of 19 June 2008. |
| 2.0 | Intel IXP420 @ 266 MHz | 16 MB | 4 MB | 2.4 GHz | SNP0 | It has a Marvell 88E6060 switch chip. The wireless is a mini-PCI card with ar5416 MAC. Runs Linux out of the box. Supported by OpenWrt. |

=== WRT310N ===
Similar to WRT350N with a Gigabit Ethernet switch, hardware crypto acceleration for IPSec, SSL, and WPA/WPA2. The WRT310N has an integrated wireless chipset rather than the external PC Card adapter found on the WRT350N. The Cisco Valet Plus M20 replaced this model.

| Version | CPU speed | RAM | Flash memory | Radio | S/N prefix | Notes |
|---|---|---|---|---|---|---|
| 1.0 | Broadcom BCM4785 @ 300 MHz | 32 MB | 4 MB | 2.4 GHz | CSF0 | Uses a Broadcom BCM4705 High-Performance 802.11n/MIMO Intensi-fi GbE Processor, Broadcom BCM4321 Draft 11n Baseband/MAC, Broadcom BCM2055 2.4 GHz Intensi-fi draft 11n radio and Broadcom BCM5397 5 port gigabit switch. Supported by DD-WRT starting with v24 build 9526. Can be upgraded to DD-WRT. |
| 2.0 | Broadcom BCM4716 @ 300 MHz | 32 MB | 4 MB | 2.4 GHz | CSF1 | Supported by DD-WRT starting with K26 build 13594. Can be upgraded to DD-WRT. |

=== WRT320N ===
802.11n "draft" MIMO router with a gigabit switch and non-simultaneous dual-band. The E2000 replaced this model. Due to the hardware being very similar, it is possible to upgrade the WRT320N to an E2000 by replacing the CFE.

| Version | CPU speed | RAM | Flash memory | Radio | S/N prefix | Notes |
|---|---|---|---|---|---|---|
| 1.0 | Broadcom BCM4717 @ 354 MHz | 32 MB | 8 MB | 2.4 GHz, 5 GHz | CUH0 | Uses a Broadcom BCM4717 System-on-Chip, Broadcom BCM4328 Draft 11n transceiver, and Broadcom BCM53115 5 port gigabit switch. DD-WRT/Tomatousb now supports the WRT320N |

=== WRT330N ===
Based on a different platform, but also has a Gigabit Ethernet switch according to the product specifications listed on the manufacturers website.

| Version | CPU speed | RAM | Flash memory | Radio | S/N prefix | Notes |
|---|---|---|---|---|---|---|
| 1.0 | Ubicom IP5160U @ 275 MHz | 32 MB | 4 MB | 2.4 GHz | PPX1 | Third-party Linux firmware is not supported on the Ubicom processor. |

=== WRT350N ===
Similar to WRT300N, but with a Gigabit Ethernet switch, hardware crypto acceleration for IPSec, SSL, and WPA/WPA2, and a USB 2.0 port for connecting a hard drive or flash-based USB storage devices directly to your network to share music, video, or data files.

| Version | CPU speed | RAM | Flash memory | Radio | S/N prefix | Notes |
|---|---|---|---|---|---|---|
| 1.0 | Broadcom BCM4785 r2/Broadcom BCM4705 @ 300 MHz | 32 MB | 8 MB | 2.4 GHz | CNQ0 | The router is compatible with DD-WRT (First compatible in V24) and OpenWrt (First compatible in 8.09RC1). Sveasoft firmware supports this hardware. Wireless Chipset Broadcom BCM4321 and Broadcom BCM2055 Switch 4 Port LAN Network 10/100/1000 Mbit/s with Broadcom BCM5397KFBG. Supported by DD-WRT. |
| 2.0 | Marvell 88F5181 @ 500 MHz | 32 MB | 8 MB | 2.4 GHz | SNQ0 | This version has the fastest speed among low-end Linksys routers. However, Linksys has released only small portions of GPL code for developers. Not supported by DD-WRT. Supported (unofficially) by OpenWrt Support for Marvell 88F5xx81 based routers |
| 2.1 | Marvell 88F5181 @ 500 MHz | 32 MB | 8 MB | 2.4 GHz | SNQ1 | |

=== WRT400N ===
A simultaneous dual-band non-gigabit model.

| Version | CPU speed | RAM | Flash memory | Radio | S/N prefix | Notes |
|---|---|---|---|---|---|---|
| 1.0 | Atheros AR7161 @ 680 MHz | 32 MB | 8 MB | 2.4 GHz, 5 GHz | MUJ0 | Fast processor. Supported by OpenWrt. Atheros radio: third-party firmware not limited by Broadcom closed-source drivers. DD-WRT support is available here |

=== WRT600N ===
A simultaneous dual-band gigabit model. It looks like WRT350N including USB 2.0 storage link except that the WRT600N is black.

| Version | CPU speed | RAM | Flash memory | Radio | S/N prefix | Notes |
|---|---|---|---|---|---|---|
| 1.0 | Broadcom BCM4705 @ 300 MHz | 32 MB | 8 MB | 2.4 GHz, 5 GHz | ANR0 | Sveasoft firmware supports the WRT600N. Works with DD-WRT. FCC ID: Q87-WRT600NV1 |
| 1.1 | Broadcom BCM4785r2 @ 300 MHz | 32 MB | 8 MB | 2.4 GHz, 5 GHz | MNR0 | Sveasoft firmware supports the WRT600N. Works with DD-WRT, version v1.1 has a new switch. OpenWRT version 14.07 and later support this hardware version. FCC ID: Q87-WRT600NV11 |

=== WRT610N ===
A simultaneous dual-band gigabit model. The hardware is more integrated than the WRT600N and has no external antennas. The E3000 replaced this model. A special system menu can be accessed by browsing to http://ip_address_of_wrt610n/System.asp. ″Vista Premium" (ability to turn off 6to4) and EGHN (Entertainment Grade Home Network = Linksys/Cisco UPnP QoS solution) can be configured in this page.

| Version | CPU speed | RAM | Flash memory | Radio | S/N prefix | Notes |
|---|---|---|---|---|---|---|
| 1.0 | Broadcom BCM4705 @ 300 MHz | 64 MB | 8 MB | 2.4 GHz, 5 GHz | CTG0 | Sveasoft firmware supports the WRT610N. Supported by DD-WRT, check router database. |
| 2.0 | Broadcom BCM4718 @ 480 MHz | 64 MB | 8 MB | 2.4 GHz, 5 GHz | CTG1 | FCC ID: Q87-WRT610NV2 Version 2.0's second radio works in N's 5 GHz band only, not the 2.4 GHz band. Supported by DD-WRT, check router database. |

=== WRT1200AC ===
The WRT1200AC is a dual band router inspired by its big brother the WRT1900AC.

| Version | CPU speed | RAM | Flash memory | Radio | S/N prefix | External ports | Notes |
|---|---|---|---|---|---|---|---|
| 1.0 | Marvell Armada 385 88F6820 1.33 GHz | 512MB | 128MB | 2.4 GHz, 5 GHz 400 Mbit/s, 867 Mbit/s | ? | 1× USB 3.0 port; 1× eSATA/USB 2.0 port | Some unconfirmed reports of the end user being able to upgrade the RAM.; Advertised as Open Source Support; 2 External Antennas; 2 Spatial Streams |

=== WRT1900AC ===
The WRT1900AC is a dual band router inspired by the original WRT54G iconic blue/black stackable form factor.

| Version | CPU speed | RAM | Flash memory | Radio | S/N prefix | External ports | Notes |
|---|---|---|---|---|---|---|---|
| 1.0 | Marvell Armada XP MV78230 1.2 GHz | 256 MB | 128 MB | 2.4 GHz, 5 GHz 600 Mbit/s, 1,300 Mbit/s | 13J1 | 1× USB 3.0 port; 1× eSATA/USB 2.0 port | Advertised as Open Source Support*; 4 External Antennas; 3 Spatial Streams |
| 2.0 | Marvell Armada 385 88F6820 1.33 GHz | 512 MB | 128 MB | | 13J2 – unreliable | 1× USB 3.0 port; 1× eSATA/USB 2.0 port | Advertised as Open Source Support*; Same hardware as WRT1200AC except WiFi; 4 External Antennas; 3 Spatial Streams |

- The WRT1900AC router is advertised as "Open Source ready", and "Developed for use with OpenWRT." However, there did not exist any open source firmware for the WRT1900AC at the time the product was launched, although Linksys/Marvell recently released updated Wi-Fi drivers in 2015.... which has allowed OpenWRT to release new open source firmware images.

=== WRT1900ACS ===
The WRT1900ACS was released 8. October 2015. It looks identical to the WRT1900AC, but has a 1.6 GHz dual core CPU (Same CPU as WRT1200AC/WRT1900AC v2, but overclocked to 1.6 GHz). Like the WRT1900AC v2, it has 512 MB of RAM. In January 2016, DD-WRT became available for the WRT1900ACS, as well as both versions of the WRT1900AC.

| Version | CPU speed | RAM | Flash memory | Radio | S/N prefix | Notes |
|---|---|---|---|---|---|---|
| 1.0 | Marvell Armada 385 88F6820 1.6 GHz | 512 MB | 128 MB | 2.4 GHz, 5 GHz 600 Mbit/s, 1,300 Mbit/s | | |

=== WRT3200ACM ===
This is a faster replacement of the WRT1900AC, but the 1900AC model can still be found. It has Tri-Stream 160 technology doubles bandwidth and the fastest dual-band of any router. MU-MIMO technology to multiple devices all at the same time, same speed. It is open-source ready with OpenWrt and DD-WRT®. Compatible with Linksys Smart Wi-Fi app to manage Wi-Fi from a mobile device. Specs refresh include a 256 MB Flash and 512 MB of RAM Memory.

| Version | CPU speed | RAM | Flash memory | Radio | S/N prefix | External ports | Notes |
|---|---|---|---|---|---|---|---|
| n/a | 1.8 GHz dual‑core ARM‑based | 512 MB DDR3 | 256 MB | 2.4 GHz (up to 600 Mbit/s); 5 GHz (up to 2.6 Gbit/s) | | 1x Gigabit WAN port 4x Gigabit LAN ports 1x USB3.0; 1x combo USB 2.0/eSATA | Advertised as "open‑source ready with OpenWrt or DD‑WRT® for complete flexibility"; 4 Di-Pole antennas (2.4GHz: 2.52 dBi, 5 GHz: 3.81 dBi); 1 PIFA antenna (Bluetooth: 3.60 dBi, 5GHz: 5.10dBi) |

=== WRT32X 3200ACM Gaming Router ===
The WRT32X 3200ACM has identical hardware to the WRT3200ACM but includes the Rivet Networks Killer Prioritization Engine which identifies systems equipped with Killer Network LAN hardware. Powered by a dual-core 1.8 GHz CPU with 256 MB of flash memory and 512 MB of DDR3 memory it is capable of speeds of up to 600 Mbit/s on 2.4 GHz band and 2600 Mbit/s on the 5 GHz band.

=== E800 ===
A single-band non-gigabit model.

| Version | CPU speed | RAM | Flash memory | Radio | S/N prefix | Notes |
|---|---|---|---|---|---|---|
| 1.0 | Broadcom BCM5357 @ 300 MHz | 32 MB | 8 MB | 2.4 GHz 2×2 | 1391 | |

=== E900 ===
A single-band non-gigabit model.

| Version | CPU speed | RAM | Flash memory | Radio | S/N prefix | Notes |
|---|---|---|---|---|---|---|
| 1.0 | Broadcom BCM5357 @ 300 MHz | 32 MB | 8 MB | 2.4 GHz 2×2 | 1231 | Supported by DD-WRT starting at build K26 build 18852; Supported by Tomato starting at K26RT-N build5x-093-EN for the Shibby builds, RT-N 1.28.0499.3 for Toastman and Tomato by Victek. |

=== E1000 ===
A single-band non-gigabit model that replaced the WRT160N. The E1000 v1 shares the same hardware as the Cisco Valet M10 v1.

| Version | CPU speed | RAM | Flash memory | Radio | S/N prefix | Notes |
|---|---|---|---|---|---|---|
| 1.0 | Broadcom BCM4716 @ 300 MHz | 32 MB | 4 MB | 2.4 GHz | CVN0 | FCC ID: Q87-E1000 Supported by DD-WRT starting at build 15279 Tomato supported by all mods/forks based on Tomato. |
| 2.0 | Broadcom BCM5357 @ 300 MHz | 32 MB | 4 MB | 2.4 GHz | CVN1 | FCC ID: Q87-E1000V2 Supported by DD-WRT starting at build 16758 |
| 2.1 | Broadcom BCM5357 @ 300 MHz | 32 MB | 4 MB | 2.4 GHz | CVN2 | FCC ID: Q87-E1000V21 Supported by DD-WRT starting at build 16968 |

=== E1200 ===
A single-band non-gigabit model.

| Version | CPU speed | RAM | Flash memory | Radio | S/N prefix | Notes |
|---|---|---|---|---|---|---|
| 1.0 | Broadcom BCM5357 @ 300 MHz | 32 MB | 4 MB | 2.4 GHz 2×2 | 1081 | FCC ID: Q87-E1200 |
| 2.0 | Broadcom BCM5357 @ 300 MHz | 32 MB | 8 MB | 2.4 GHz 2×2 | 1082 | FCC ID: Q87-E1200V2 |

=== E1500 ===
A single-band non-gigabit model.

| Version | CPU speed | RAM | Flash memory | Radio | S/N prefix | Notes |
|---|---|---|---|---|---|---|
| 1.0 | Broadcom BCM5357 @ 300 MHz | 32 MB | 8 MB | 2.4 GHz 2×3 | 1091 | FCC ID: Q87-E1500 |

=== E1550 ===
A single-band non-gigabit model with USB storage link.

| Version | CPU speed | RAM | Flash memory | Radio | S/N prefix | Notes |
|---|---|---|---|---|---|---|
| 1.0 | Broadcom BCM5358 @ 300 MHz | 64 MB | 16 MB | 2.4 GHz 2×3 | 10C10 | FCC ID: Q87-E1550 Supported by DD-WRT perfectly at 19519 use mini e1550 bin if coming from Linksys official then use mega NV60K. |

=== E1700 ===
A single-band 4 port gigabit model.

| Version | CPU speed | RAM | Flash memory | Radio | S/N prefix | Notes |
|---|---|---|---|---|---|---|
| 1.0 | MediaTek MT7620A @ 580 MHz | 32 MB | 8 MB | 2.4 GHz 2×2 | | |

=== E2000 ===
A non-simultaneous dual-band gigabit model that replaced the WRT320N.

| Version | CPU speed | RAM | Flash memory | Radio | S/N prefix | Notes |
|---|---|---|---|---|---|---|
| 1.0 | Broadcom BCM4717 @ 354 MHz | 32 MB | 8 MB | 2.4 GHz, 5 GHz Not Simultaneous | CVR0 | FCC ID: Q87-E2000 Supported by DD-WRT starting at build 14567 C Tomato supported by the TomatoUSB Project and by the Tomato RAF Project |

=== E2100L ===
A single-band non-gigabit model (with 2 external antennas and USB storage link) that replaced the WRT160NL.

| Version | CPU speed | RAM | Flash memory | Radio | S/N prefix | Notes |
|---|---|---|---|---|---|---|
| 1.0 | Atheros 9130 @ 400 MHz | 64 MB | 8 MB | 2.4 GHz | CVM0 | FCC ID: Q87-E2100L DD-WRT supported with this experimental build (login required to download attachment) |

=== E2500 ===
A simultaneous dual-band non-gigabit model.

| Version | CPU speed | RAM | Flash memory | Radio | S/N prefix | Notes |
|---|---|---|---|---|---|---|
| 1.0 | Broadcom BCM5358U @ 300 MHz | 64 MB | 8 MB | 2.4 GHz, 5 GHz | 10A1 | FCC ID: Q87-E2500 Supported by Tomato RAF, Toastman and Shibby |
| 2.0 | Broadcom BCM5358U @ 300 MHz | 64 MB | 8 MB | 2.4 GHz, 5 GHz | 10A2 | Supported by Tomato RAF, Toastman, and Shibby |
| 3.0 | Broadcom BCM5358U | 64 MB | 16 MB | 2.4 GHz, 5 GHz | 10A3 | Includes USB port |

=== E3000 ===
A simultaneous dual-band gigabit model that replaced the WRT610N. Similar to its predecessor, a special system menu can be accessed by browsing to http://ip_address_of_e3000/System.asp which displays a detailed system status page and allows administrators to disable/enable "Vista Premium" and the "Parental Control Status".

| Version | CPU speed | RAM | Flash memory | Radio | S/N prefix | USB ports | Notes |
|---|---|---|---|---|---|---|---|
| 1.0 | Broadcom BCM4718 @ 480 MHz | 64 MB | 8 MB | 2.4 GHz, 5 GHz | CVQ0 | 1× USB 2.0 | FCC ID: Q87-E3000 Supported by DD-WRT starting at build 14567 Tomato supported. |

=== E3200 ===
A simultaneous dual-band gigabit model with USB storage link.

| Version | CPU speed | RAM | Flash memory | Radio | S/N prefix | Notes |
|---|---|---|---|---|---|---|
| 1.0 | Broadcom BCM47186 @ 500 MHz | 64 MB | 16 MB | 2.4 GHz, 5 GHz; 300 Mbit/s, 300 Mbit/s | 10B1 | FCC ID: Q87-E3200 Supported by DD-WRT as of build 17201 Supported by Tomato RAF , Toastman and Shibby |

=== E4200 ===
A three-stream simultaneous dual-band gigabit model targeted for "high performance wireless entertainment", with a rated maximum throughput of 450 Mbit/s. This model also includes a USB port for storage, UPnP media streaming or a print server.

The E4200 also marks the first radical change in the design of the Linksys series since Cisco launched the winged "spaceship" design first seen on the WRT400N. The E4200 features a minimalistic, streamlined design with only a white status LED visible on the top. All traffic activity LEDs and buttons have been relocated to the rear of the device.

A special system menu can be accessed by browsing to http://ip_address_of_e4200/System.asp. This menu shows all kinds of system statistics and settings. No settings can be changed from this menu. This is only found in the original version, and not available in the v2 model.

The E4200V2 has a Marvell 88W8366/88W8063 wireless chipset.

In previous Tomato builds (a popular 3rd-party firmware for Linksys routers), only the 2.4 GHz radio was properly supported. However, simultaneous dual-band radio can now be achieved using Tomato RAF, Tomato Shibby and Tomato Toastman's builds.

| Version | CPU speed | RAM | Flash memory | Radio | S/N prefix | Notes |
|---|---|---|---|---|---|---|
| 1.0 | Broadcom BCM4718 @ 480 MHz | 64 MB | 16 MB | 2.4 GHz, 5 GHz 300 Mbit/s, 450 Mbit/s | 01C10C | FCC ID: Q87-E4200 Supported by DD-WRT as of build 16785 Tomato supported. TomatoUSB Tomato RAF Toastman Shibby |
| 2.0 | Marvell F6101AW @ 1.2 GHz | 128 MB | 128 MB | 2.4 GHz, 5 GHz 450 Mbit/s, 450 Mbit/s | 01C106, 01C116, 01C136, 01C156 | Fully supported by OpenWRT |

=== EA2700 ===
A dual-band gigabit model. App enabled with Linksys Smart WiFi.

| Version | CPU speed | RAM | Flash memory | Radio | S/N prefix | Notes |
|---|---|---|---|---|---|---|
| 1.0 | Broadcom BCM47186 @ 500 MHz | 64 MB | 64 MB | 2.4 GHz, 5 GHz 300 Mbit/s, 300 Mbit/s | 12B1 | DD-WRT support is work in progress since April 2012. Working build available December 18, 2013 |

=== EA3500 ===
A dual-band gigabit model with USB storage link. App enabled with Linksys Smart WiFi.

| Version | CPU speed | RAM | Flash memory | Radio | S/N prefix | Notes |
|---|---|---|---|---|---|---|
| 1.0 | Marvell 88F6282 @ 800 MHz | 64 MB | 64 MB | 2.4 GHz, 5 GHz 300 Mbit/s, 450 Mbit/s | 12C1 | Supported by OpenWRT (Chaos Calmer) and Debian <http://www.wolfteck.com/projects/candyhouse/install/> |

=== EA4500 ===
A dual-band gigabit model with USB storage link. App enabled with Linksys Smart WiFi.

| Version | CPU speed | RAM | Flash memory | Radio | S/N prefix | Notes |
|---|---|---|---|---|---|---|
| 1.0 | Marvell F6W01A1E @ 1.2 GHz | 128 MB | 128 MB | 2.4 GHz, 5 GHz 450 Mbit/s, 450 Mbit/s | 12A1 | Identical hardware to the E4200v2. Supported by OpenWrt, can run Debian natively. |
| 3.0 | QCA9558 @ 720 MHz | 128 MB | 128 MB | 2.4 GHz, 5 GHz 450 Mbit/s, 450 Mbit/s | 12A1 | Cisco logo on cover was changed to Linksys logo |

=== EA6100 ===
An 802.11ac dual-band model with USB storage link

| Version | CPU speed | RAM | Flash memory | Radio | S/N prefix | USB ports | Notes |
|---|---|---|---|---|---|---|---|
| 1.0 | MediaTek MT7620A @ 580 MHz | 128 MB | 128 MB | 2.4 GHz, 5 GHz 300 Mbit/s, 867 Mbit/s | | 1× USB 2.0 | |

=== EA6200 ===
An 802.11ac (advertised as AC900, actually AC1200) dual-band gigabit model with USB storage link. App enabled with Linksys Smart WiFi.

| Version | CPU speed | RAM | Flash memory | Radio | S/N prefix | USB ports | Notes |
|---|---|---|---|---|---|---|---|
| 1.0 | Broadcom BCM47081 @ 800 MHz | 128 MB | 128 MB | 2.4 GHz, 5 GHz 300 Mbit/s, 867 Mbit/s | 12K1 | 1× USB 3.0 | 12V, 2A |

=== EA6300 ===
An 802.11ac (AC1200) dual-band gigabit model with USB storage link. App enabled with Linksys Smart WiFi.

| Version | CPU speed | RAM | Flash memory | Radio | S/N prefix | USB ports | Notes |
|---|---|---|---|---|---|---|---|
| 1.0 | Broadcom BCM47081 @ 800 MHz | 128 MB | 128 MB | 2.4 GHz, 5 GHz 300 Mbit/s, 867 Mbit/s | 1331 | 1× USB 3.0 | 12V,3A |

=== EA6350 ===
An 802.11ac (AC1200) dual-band gigabit model with USB storage link. App enabled with Linksys Smart WiFi.

| Version | CPU speed | RAM | Flash memory | Radio | S/N prefix | USB ports | Notes |
|---|---|---|---|---|---|---|---|
| 1.0 | Broadcom BCM47081 @ 800 MHz | 128 MB | 128 MB | 2.4 GHz, 5 GHz 300 Mbit/s, 867 Mbit/s | ? | 1× USB 3.0 | |

=== EA6400 ===
An 802.11ac (AC1600) dual-band gigabit model with USB storage link. App enabled with Linksys Smart WiFi.

| Version | CPU speed | RAM | Flash memory | Radio | S/N prefix | USB ports | Notes |
|---|---|---|---|---|---|---|---|
| 1.0 | Broadcom BCM4708 @ 800 MHz dual-core | 128 MB | 128 MB | 2.4 GHz, 5 GHz 300 Mbit/s, 1,300 Mbit/s | 1341 | 1× USB 3.0 | |

=== EA6500 ===
An 802.11ac (AC1750) dual-band gigabit model with USB storage link. App enabled with Linksys Smart WiFi.

| Version | CPU speed | RAM | Flash memory | Radio | S/N prefix | USB ports | Notes |
|---|---|---|---|---|---|---|---|
| 1.0 | Broadcom BCM4706 @ 600 MHz | 128 MB | 128 MB | 2.4 GHz, 5 GHz 450 Mbit/s, 1,300 Mbit/s | 12N1 | 2× USB 2.0 | DD-WRT can be flashed with an experimental build. |
| 2.0 | Broadcom BCM4708 @ 800 MHz dual-core | 256 MB | 128 MB | 2.4 GHz, 5 GHz 450 Mbit/s, 1,300 Mbit/s | 12N2 | 1× USB 3.0, 1× USB 2.0 | DD-WRT can be flashed with build r23598, Supported by Tomato starting at Tomato-ARM v129 from Shibby |

=== EA6700 ===
An 802.11ac (AC1750) dual-band gigabit model with USB storage link. App enabled with Linksys Smart WiFi.

| Version | CPU speed | RAM | Flash memory | Radio | S/N prefix | USB ports | Notes |
|---|---|---|---|---|---|---|---|
| 1.0 | Broadcom BCM4708x @ 800 MHz dual-core | 256 MB(DDR-3) | 128 MB | 2.4 GHz, 5 GHz 450 Mbit/s, 1,300 Mbit/s | 1371 | 1× USB 3.0, 1× USB 2.0 | DDWRT (beta) installable since December 2013, Supported by Tomato starting at Tomato-ARM v129 from Shibby |

=== EA6900 ===
An 802.11ac (AC1900) dual-band gigabit model with USB storage link. App enabled with Linksys Smart WiFi.

| Version | CPU speed | RAM | Flash memory | Radio | S/N prefix | USB ports | Notes |
|---|---|---|---|---|---|---|---|
| 1.0 | Broadcom BCM4708 @ 800 MHz dual-core | 256 MB | 128 MB | 2.4 GHz, 5 GHz 600 Mbit/s, 1,300 Mbit/s | 13H10 | 1× USB 3.0, 1× USB 2.0 | DDWRT (beta) installable since December 2013 (to first flash use older rev due to size limitation), Supported by Tomato starting at Tomato-ARM v129 from Shibby |
| 1.1 | | | | | 13H11 | 1× USB 3.0, 1× USB 2.0 | |

=== EA8300 ===
An 802.11ac (AC2200) MU-MIMO, tri-band, 'Max-Stream' gigabit model with USB 3.0 storage link. Browser-based setup or Linksys App.

| Version | CPU speed | RAM | Flash memory | Radio | S/N prefix | USB ports | Notes |
|---|---|---|---|---|---|---|---|
| 1.0 | Qualcomm IPQ4019 @ 717 MHz quad-core | 256 MB | 256 MB | 2.4 GHz, 5 GHz 400 Mbit/s, 867 Mbit/s, 867 Mbit/s | ? | 1× USB 3.0 | Supported by OpenWRT |

=== E8350 ===
An 802.11ac (AC2400) dual-band MU-MIMO gigabit router.

| Version | CPU speed | RAM | Flash memory | Radio | S/N prefix | USB ports | Notes |
|---|---|---|---|---|---|---|---|
| 1.0 | Qualcomm IPQ8064 @ 1.4 GHz dual-core Qualcomm Atheros IPQ4019, Qualcomm Atheros QCA9886 | 512 MB 128 MB | 256 MB & 16 MB | 2.4 GHz, 5 GHz 600 Mbit/s, 1,733 Mbit/s | ? | 1× USB 3.0, 1× USB 2.0/eSATA | ? |

=== EA8500 ===
An 802.11ac (AC2600) dual-band MU-MIMO gigabit router.

| Version | CPU speed | RAM | Flash memory | Radio | S/N prefix | USB ports | Notes |
|---|---|---|---|---|---|---|---|
| 1.0 | Qualcomm dual-core IPQ8064 1.4 GHz dual-core processor | 512MB | 128 MB | 2.4 GHz, 5 GHz 800 Mbit/s, 1,733 Mbit/s | ? | 1× USB 3.0, 1× USB 2.0/eSATA | ? |

=== EA9200 ===
An 802.11ac (AC3200) tri-band MU-MIMO gigabit router.

| Version | CPU speed | RAM | Flash memory | Radio | S/N prefix | USB ports yes | Notes |
|---|---|---|---|---|---|---|---|
| 1 | 1 GHz dual-core CPU + three integrated co-processors for total of 2.98 GHz | 256 MB | 128 MB | 1× 2.4 GHz (600 Mbit/s), 2× 5 GHz (1300 Mbit/s) | ? | 1× USB 3.0, 1× USB 2.0 | ? |

== See also ==
- Cisco Valet Routers
