= Linksys WRV54G router =

Linux-based router by Linksys

Linksys WRV54G is a Linux-based router that supports 50 VPN tunnels and 5 simultaneous clients. It supports Wireless-G connectivity and 4-port 10/100 Ethernet hub. Unlike the WRT54G series, the WRV54 uses an Intel IXP425 processor, which supports hardware-based encryption, but is costlier. WRV54G is the first Linksys router that supports the proprietary Linksys program QuickVPN, which simplifies VPN setup. Although it was released in 2004, WRV54G is not yet fully supported by OpenWrt firmware.
