= Cisco Valet routers =

Family of home networking products

On March 30, 2010 Cisco unveiled a new series of home networking products called "Valet". The focus of this series is to simplify the installation and configuration of a typical wireless home network by shipping routers partially pre-configured and bundling with them software that aids the user in setting up their network with a step-by-step wizard.

While the early Valet routers are based on variants of Cisco's Linksys routers, the Valet series is not tied to the Linksys brand and is marketed separately.

== Specifications and versions ==
=== Valet M10 ===
The Valet M10 along with the Valet Plus M20 were Cisco's first routers in the Valet series. The M10 is a 2.4 GHz single-band 802.11n wireless router featuring 10/100 LAN connectivity. The v1 of this model is equivalent to the Linksys E1000 v1 and WRT160N v3, sharing the same hardware and specifications. It is white in color and features a light blue trim.

Third Party Firmware: DD-WRT & Tomato Firmware releases have been known to work on the v1 unit.

| Version | CPU | RAM | Flash memory | Radio | S/N Prefix | Notes |
|---|---|---|---|---|---|---|
| 1.0 | Broadcom BCM4716 @ 300 MHz | 32 MB | 4 MB | 2.4 GHz | CVJ0 | FCC ID: Q87-M10 3rd Party Tomato Firmware is available here. Also runs Tomato Firmware v1.28.7500 MIPSR2Toastman-RT K26 Std dd-wrt firmware is supported as well. |
| 2.0 | Broadcom BCM5357 @ 300 MHz | 32 MB | 4 MB | 2.4 GHz | CVJ1 | FCC ID: Q87-M10V2 Also supported by custom M10v2 Tomato firmware by Toastman and Shibby. |

=== Valet Plus M20 ===
The M20 is a 2.4 GHz single-band 802.11n wireless router featuring gigabit LAN connectivity. This model is equivalent to the Linksys WRT310N v2, also sharing the same hardware and specifications. It is white in color and features a silver trim.

| Version | CPU | RAM | Flash memory | Radio | S/N Prefix | Notes |
|---|---|---|---|---|---|---|
| 1.0 | Broadcom BCM4716 @ 300 MHz | 32 MB | 4 MB | 2.4 GHz | CVK0 | Untested trailed build of DD-WRT 14471 available. Tested and works well with TomatoUSB NoUSB-VPN K26 MIPSR2 firmware. TomatoUSB installation on WRT310n V2 and Cisco Valet Plus M20 FCC ID: Q87-M20 |

== Default settings ==
- IP address: 192.168.1.1
- Web interface username: "admin"
- Password: "admin"
