= Topfield Application Program =

Digital video application

A Topfield Application Program (TAP) is a software application which extends the standard functionality of the Topfield products designed for digital TV. Examples of TAPs are electronic programme guides, digital photo viewers and MP3 players.

Anyone with the necessary computer programming skills may create a TAP to meet their needs. This is possible because Topfield have specified an open (or public) API which allows TAPs to be created using the C or C++ programming languages. They can be installed into most Topfield PVR models.

Some people have created TAPs and made them available for others to download and use, either free of charge or for a small fee. There are several internet forums dedicated to TAPs where information and support can be exchanged.
