= Linksys WAG300N router =

Network router by Linksys

Linksys WAG300N is a Draft-N wireless gateway (router plus ADSL2+ modem) with two large captive antennas and 4 Ethernet ports. It was the smallest such device tested by MacUser, but the web interface was deemed "infuriating" and transfer rates to a MacBook "untenably slow". WAG300N is based on a Broadcom BCM63xx SoC, and runs a Linux-based firmware.

- Last most recent official released firmware:
- Product Versions: (Annex A)/(Annex B)
- Classification: Firmware Release History
- Release Date: 23 May 2008
- Firmware-Version: 1.01.07 (ETSI)
