= TF5800PVR =

Personal video recorder

The TF5800PVR and similar TF5800PVRt is the UK Freeview version of Topfield's TF5000PVRt, which is a personal video recorder (PVR) with twin tuners; it is possible to record two programs and view a third so long as all programs do not use more than two multiplexes. Firmware upgrades were distributed over-the-air using the normal FreeView distribution method, and are also available for Internet download.

Topfield devices are often referred to as “Toppys”.

The device has the features expected from a dual-tuner PVR, but also allows extensive software customisation by the use of TAPs (described below). Files (TV programmes, MP3 files, and operating files) can be transferred over USB between the PVR and a computer.

The TF5800PVR[t] was replaced by the TF5810PVRt with similar functionality, but which also supports HDMI output (from standard, but not HD, broadcasts—reception of Freeview HD channels requires a DVB-T2 receiver, which the TF5810PVRt is not). The latest factory firmware versions for both models incorporate some features equivalent to Freeview+.

== File transfer between PVR and computer ==
The USB 2.0 socket allows files to be transported both ways between the device and a computer running transfer software written for this purpose. Microsoft Windows, Mac OS X, and some versions of Linux/Unix are supported. Files of any kind can be moved in both directions but the feature is mainly used

- to move a recording to a computer for viewing with media-playing software or burning to a DVD
- to move MP3 audio files to the PVR
- to move TAPs and new versions of firmware to the PVR
- to load extended 14-day EPG data to the PVR, in place of the standard broadcast 7-day Freeview EPG.

USB file transfer is rather slow. It can be accelerated to some extent by using the transfer software's Turbo mode and by using TAPs which eliminate unnecessary handshaking signals.

== Topfield Application Programs (TAPs) and firmware ==
The functionality of the TF5800PVR can be enhanced via the use of Topfield Application Programs (TAP). TAPs are C programs, developed by users for users. They can be developed under Microsoft Windows using a Topfield platform cross-compiler (GCC for TAP) or the Cygwin GCC compiler.

TAPs are applications written using an API available free from the manufacturer. The API provides access to almost all features of the device: TAPs can access EPG information, change channels, start or stop a recording session, change pre-set recording timers, write text and draw graphics to the screen, and react to buttons pressed on the remote control. It is possible to write a useful program, adding useful functionality, in ten lines of C code.

TAPs have been written to provide many enhancements to the Toppy. Most are available as freeware. Although some technical users consider enhancement via TAPs to be the best thing about the device, the PVR works normally without any.

Firmware can be downloaded to a computer and transferred via USB to the PVR. Unlike the majority of electronics devices, many users do not recommend always updating to the manufacturer's latest firmware, instead recommending versions of firmware that have been debugged and enhanced by users. As of October 2013 the Toppy website recommended TF5800PVR/PVRt firmware 5.13.65T, a modified version of August 2007 factory firmware 5.13.65. The last firmware released by the manufacturer was the July 2008 5.14.09Plus. Different releases apply to the TF5810PVRt.

Patches to the firmware can be downloaded to a computer and transferred to the PVR.
