= Linksys =

British technology company

Linksys Holdings, Inc.
- Type: Subsidiary
- Industry: Networking equipment
- Founded: 1988; 38 years ago
- Founders: Victor Tsao; Janie Tsao
- Headquarters: Milton Keynes, England (legal); Irvine, California (operational)
- Products: Routers, DSL/cable gateways, switches, wireless access points, storage and security IP cameras
- Parent: Cisco Systems (2003–2013); Belkin (2013–2018); Foxconn Interconnect Technology (2018–2025); Fortinet (2025–present)
- Website: www.linksys.com

Linksys Holdings, Inc., is a British-American brand of data networking hardware products mainly sold to home users and small businesses. It was founded in 1988 by the couple Victor and Janie Tsao, both Taiwanese immigrants to the United States. Linksys products include Wi-Fi routers, mesh Wi-Fi systems, Wifi extenders, access points, network switches, and Wi-Fi networking. It is operationally headquartered in Irvine, California, where the majority of its senior executives reside, although its legal headquarters are in Milton Keynes, in England.

Linksys products are sold direct-to-consumer from its website, through online retailers and marketplaces, as well as off-the-shelf in consumer electronics and big-box retail stores. As of 2020, Linksys products are sold in retail locations and value-added resellers in 64 countries and was the first router company to ship 100 million products.

== History ==
Logo used from 2013 to 2022

In 1988, spouses Janie and Victor Tsao founded DEW International, later renamed Linksys, in the garage of their Irvine, California home. The Tsaos were immigrants from Taiwan who held second jobs as consultants specializing in pairing American technology vendors with manufacturers in Taiwan. The founders used Taiwanese manufacturing to achieve its early success. The company's first products were printer sharers that connected multiple PCs to printers. The company expanded into Ethernet hubs, network cards, and cords. In 1992, the Tsaos began running Linksys full time and moved the company and its growing staff to a formal office. By 1994, it had grown to 55 employees with annual revenues of $6.5 million.

Linksys received a major boost in 1995, when Microsoft released Windows 95 with built-in networking functions that expanded the market for its products. Linksys established its first U.S. retail channels with Fry's Electronics (1995) and Best Buy (1996). In the late 1990s, Linksys released the first affordable multiport router, popularizing Linksys as a home networking brand. By 2003, when the company was acquired by Cisco, it had 305 employees and revenues of more than $500 million.

Cisco expanded the company's product line, acquiring VoIP maker Sipura Technology in 2005 and selling its products under Linksys Voice System or later Linksys Business Series brands. In July 2008, Cisco acquired Seattle-based Pure Networks, a vendor of home networking-management software.

Cisco announced in January 2013 that it would sell its home networking division and Linksys to Belkin, giving Belkin 30% of the home router market.

In 2018, Belkin and its subsidiaries, including Linksys, were acquired by Foxconn, a Taiwanese multinational electronics firm and the largest provider of electronics manufacturing services, for $866 million.

On June 4, 2021, Harry Dewhirst was appointed as CEO. In September, cybersecurity firm Fortinet made a $75 million investment in Linksys. Their focus is on the security of home networks for remote workplaces. On September 24, 2021, Fortinet invested an additional $85 million in cash for shares of Series A Preferred Stock of Linksys. Mark Sanders became CFO in October.

In 2023, the company starts its global expansion with a development centre in Taipei (Taiwan) and a new sales and marketing centre in Amstelveen (The Netherlands). The new facilities are close to leading technology centres and universities.

On January 31, 2025, Fortinet acquired the remaining outstanding Series A Preferred Stock of Linksys for $20.8 million, making Linksys wholly owned by Fortinet.

== Products ==
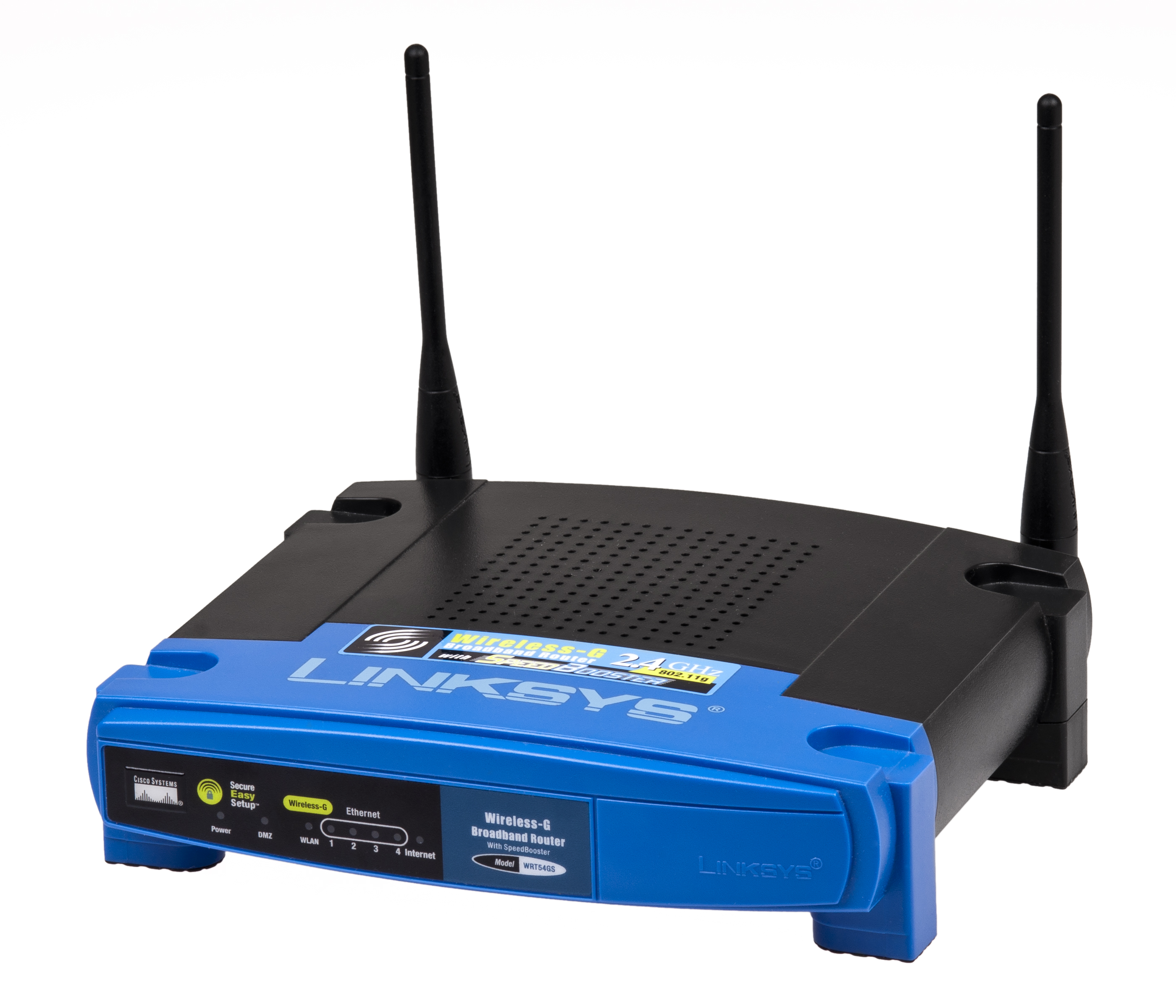
A Linksys Wi-Fi router

Linksys initially sold connectors for PCs and printers before newer forms of connecting home and business networks through wired Ethernet and wireless technologies. Its networking products include Gigabit switches, Wi-Fi routers, Intelligent Mesh Wi-Fi systems, Wi-Fi extenders, Wi-Fi access points, and networking components.

Linksys Aware was introduced in 2019 as a first-to-market home monitoring system that alerts users to movement in their home through the Velop Triband system. In 2020, Linksys released Linksys Shield, a parental control subscription service for the Velop AC2200 Triband that allows users to manage or block online content.

The company also announced its Linksys Cloud Manager 2.0, which included a configurable captive portal.

=== Routers ===
Linksys released its first Wi-Fi router in 2001 and has maintained early router releases for newer generations of Wi-Fi.

The WRT54G was notable for having firmware based on the Linux operating system. Since version 5, flash memory was reduced from 4 MB to 2 MB, and VxWorks was used instead of Linux. The original Linux model with 4 MB was later available as the WRT54GL.

In 2017, Linksys launched the Velop line, a multi-unit tri-band mesh router system that uses three Wi-Fi radios.

First announced in 2020, Linksys began marketing home-based Linksys smart routers and Velop Mesh Wi-Fi.

In April 2021, launched its first Wi-Fi 6E-certified systems, including Hydra Pro 6E router and the Atlas Max 6E mesh system. In January 2022, Linksys launched Hydra Pro 6, a scaled-back version of the 6E model.

=== Wi-Fi systems ===
The Linksys Intelligent Mesh line, Velop, combines Linksys software and hardware to provide higher connection speeds throughout a location by using nodes with dynamic networking capabilities. Linksys in 2019, with the Linksys Aware line, was first to release mesh nodes as motion sensors, utilizing Wi-Fi signals without having to rely on other sensor devices.

Linksys markets Wi-Fi extenders that work with most Wi-Fi and ISP routers, including dual or tri-band units, and plug-in devices that eliminate Wi-Fi dead zones by wirelessly communicating with a router.

In 2018, Linksys released its cloud-based Wi-Fi management for business-class access points, the Linksys Cloud Manager.

Linksys markets mesh Wi-Fi routers built for Wi-Fi 6 capacity, offering four times the speed and capacity of Wi-Fi 5. The mesh Velop Wi-Fi 6, announced in October 2019.

In 2020, Linksys debuted 5G mobile hotspots, modems, mesh gateways, and outdoor routers.

At CES 2021, Linksys announced a line of Velop mesh systems and routers that support Wi-Fi 6E.

=== HomeWRK ===
HomeWRK is a two-node, mesh-enabled Wi-Fi 6 router. The appliance provides separate wireless networks for personal and business traffic. Fortinet's security stack runs on the device, blocking malware, ransomware, and filtering content.

== See also ==
- Broadcom Inc.
- Free Software Foundation, Inc. v. Cisco Systems, Inc.
- Linksys iPhone
- List of router firmware projects
- Marvell Technology Group
- Ralink
