= WYR =

WYR may refer to:

- West Yorkshire Railway
- West Yorkshire Regiment, an infantry unit of the British Army, active 1685–1958
- WYR series, a wireless router from Buffalo Technology
