= Air station =

Air station may refer to:

- Buffalo AirStation, a series of wireless LAN equipment sold by Buffalo Technology
- Military air base
  - Naval air station
- A station for refilling compressed-air vehicles
