= Buffalo network-attached storage series =

Network-attached storage devices

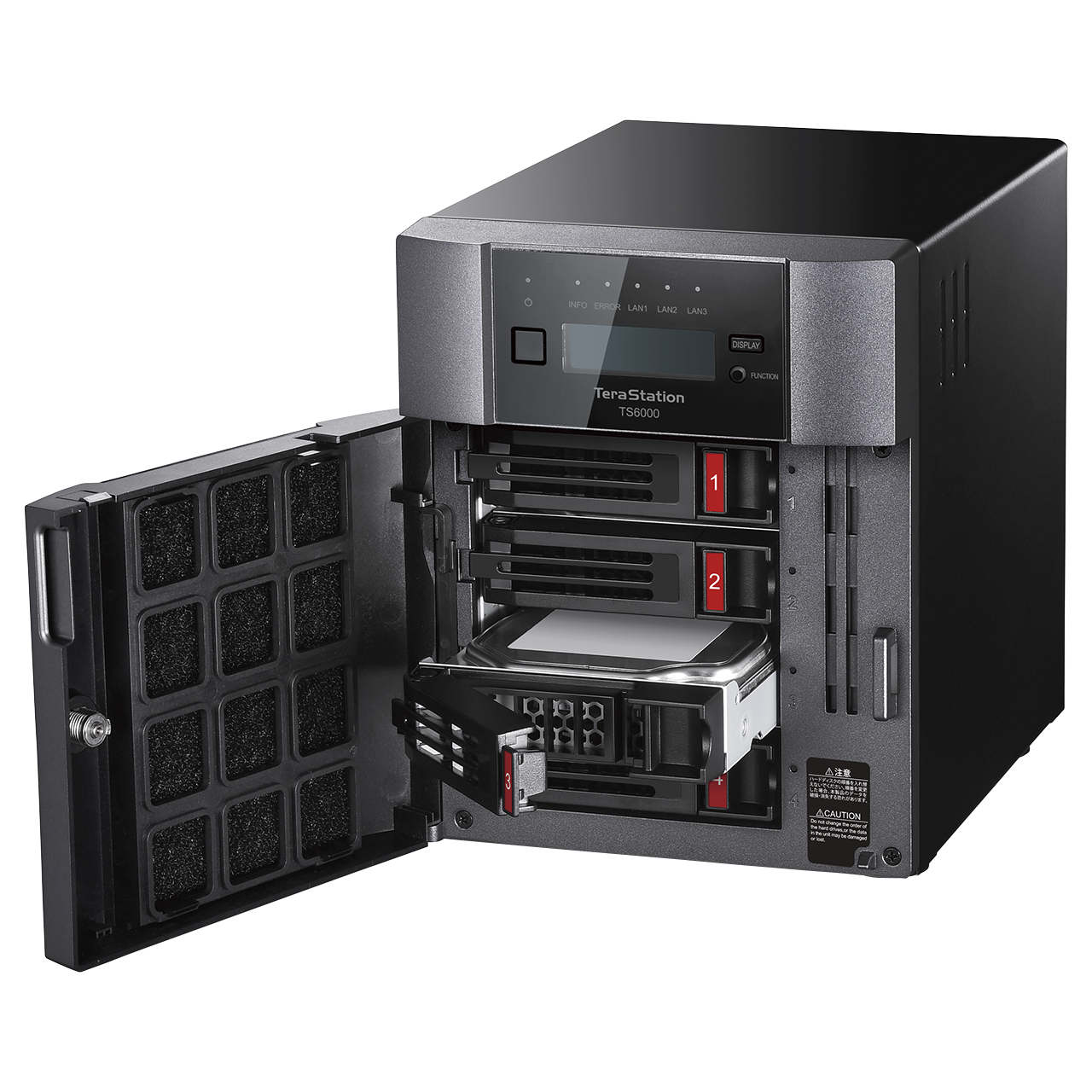
- Buffalo TeraStation
- Manufacturer: Melco
- Type: Network-attached storage
- Operating system: Linux, Windows Storage Server
- CPU: PowerPC, MIPSel, ARM
- Connectivity: 100BASE-TX, 1000BASE-T
- Website: https://www.buffalotech.com/

The Buffalo TeraStation network-attached storage series are network-attached storage (NAS) devices.

The current lineup includes the LinkStation and TeraStation series. These devices have undergone various improvements since they were first produced, and have expanded to include a Windows Storage Server-based operating system.

== History ==
Buffalo released the first TeraStation model, the HD-HTGL/R5, in December 2004. The second generation models, the TS-TGL/R5, was released the following year with uninterrupted operation and improved operational stability. This was followed up with the TeraStation Pro and the TeraStation Pro II in 2006, which offered iSCSI support, as well as 2U rackmount models. in 2008, the fourth generation TS-X models were released with hot swapping and replication, along with IU rackmount versions.

== TeraStation ==
The TeraStation is a network-attached storage device using a PowerPC or ARM architecture processor. Many TeraStation models are shipped with enterprise-grade internal hard drives mounted in a RAID array. Since January 2012, the TeraStation uses LIO for its iSCSI target.

TeraStation Models
Series	Features	CPU	RAM	Form Factor
TeraStation 5020 WSS	Hot-swappable drives, integration with third party cloud providers, data replication, rsync integration, duplex firmware; WSS models includes Windows Storage Server 2016 operating system	Intel Atom C3338	8GB DDR4 with ECC	2-, 4-, or 6-bay desktop and 4-bay rackmount
TeraStation 3010 Series	Hot-swappable drives, integration with third party cloud providers, data replication, rsync integration, iSCSI target support, duplex firmware	Annapurna Labs AL-212 Dual-Core 1.4 GHz	1 GB DDR3	2- or 4-bay desktop and 4-bay rackmount
TeraStation 5010 Series	10 GbE networking, hot-swappable NAS-grade drives, integration with third party cloud providers, data replication, rsync integration, iSCSI target support, duplex firmware	Annapurna Labs AL-314 Quad-Core 1.7 GHz	4 GB DDR3 with ECC, 8 GB DDR3 with ECC (12-bay rackmount)	2-, 4-, or 8-bay desktop and 4- or 12-bay rackmount
TeraStation 6000 Series	10 GbE networking, hot-swappable NAS-grade drives, snapshots, integration with third party cloud providers, data replication, rsync integration, iSCSI target support, duplex firmware	Intel Atom C3538	8 GB DDR4 with ECC	4-bay desktop and 4-bay rackmount

== LinkStation ==
The LinkStation is a network-attached storage device using a PowerPC or ARM architecture processor designed for personal use, aiming to serve as a central media hub and backup storage for a household. Compared to the TeraStation series, LinkStation devices typically offer more streamlined UI and media server features.

LinkStation Models
Series	Features	CPU	RAM	Form Factor
LinkStation 200 Series	Low-cost NAS device designed for home media backup and streaming with features such as DLNA support and direct copy	Marvell Armada 370 800 MHz dual issue ARM	256 MB DDR3	2-bay desktop
LinkStation 500 Series	Designed for home office users, with more robust backup and streaming features	Realtek RTD1195N 1.1 GHz Dual-Core	256 MB DDR3	2-bay desktop
LinkStation SoHo	Designed to be an entry-level home office device with data storage and backup capabilities, direct copy, UPS sync,	Marvell Armada 370 800 MHz dual issue ARM	256 MB DDR3	2-bay desktop

== Current Product Lineup ==
=== LinkStation ===
The LinkStation is notable among the Linux community both in Japan and in the US/Europe for being "hackable" into a generic Linux appliance and made to do tasks other than the file storage and sharing tasks for which it was designed. As the device runs on Linux, and included changes to the Linux source code, Buffalo was required to release their modified versions of source code as per the terms of the GNU General Public License. Due to the availability of source code and the relatively low cost of the device, there are several community projects centered around it. There are two main replacement firmware releases available for the device: the first is OpenLink which is based on the official Buffalo firmware with some modifications and features added. The other is FreeLink, which is a Debian distribution.

=== TeraStation ===
Like the LinkStation, TeraStation devices run its own version of Linux, and some models run Windows Storage Server 2016. Debian and Gentoo Linux distributions and NetBSD are reported to have been ported to it.

== Operation ==
The device in various iterations ships with its own Universal Plug and Play protocol for distribution of multimedia stored on the device. It can also be configured as a variety of different media servers TwonkyVision Media server, a SlimServer/SqueezeCenter server, an iTunes server using the Digital Audio Access Protocol, a Samba server, an LIO iSCSI target, MLDonkey client, as well as a Network File System server for Posix-based systems. For use as a backup server, it can be modified to use Rsync to back up or synchronize data from one or many computers in the network pushing their data, or even having the LinkStation pulling the data from remote servers—beside the use of the Buffalo-provided backup software for Windows. It has also found use in a number of other ways, notably through its USB interface which comes configured as a Print server but can also use CUPS to act as such for a USB Printer. Users have managed to get it to use a number of other USB devices with the version 2.6 Linux kernel's enhanced USB support. Additionally, because the Apache HTTP Server software is already installed for the purpose of providing the Buffalo configuration screens, the device is easily converted to be a lightweight web server (with the Buffalo content deleted) that can then serve any content of the operator's choice.

== Achievements ==
The LinkStation and TeraStation NAS devices have won various industry awards since their introduction, such as the TS51210RH winning Storage Product of the Year for the 2018 Network Computing Awards. The TeraStation has also won the SMB External Storage Hardware category of the CRN® Annual Report Card (ARC) awards, which recognizes exceptional vendor performance, for three years in a row.

== Gallery ==
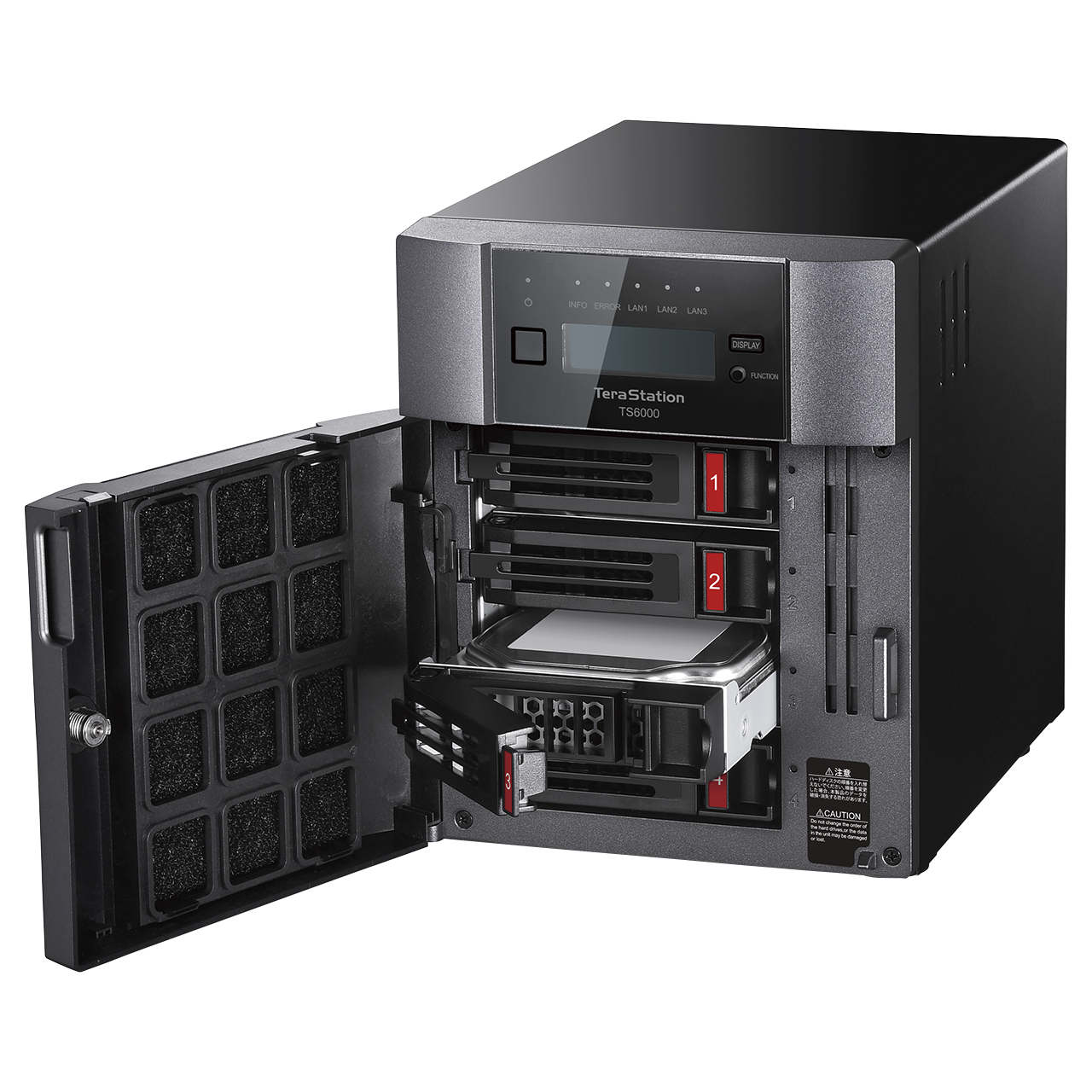
TeraStation Desktop

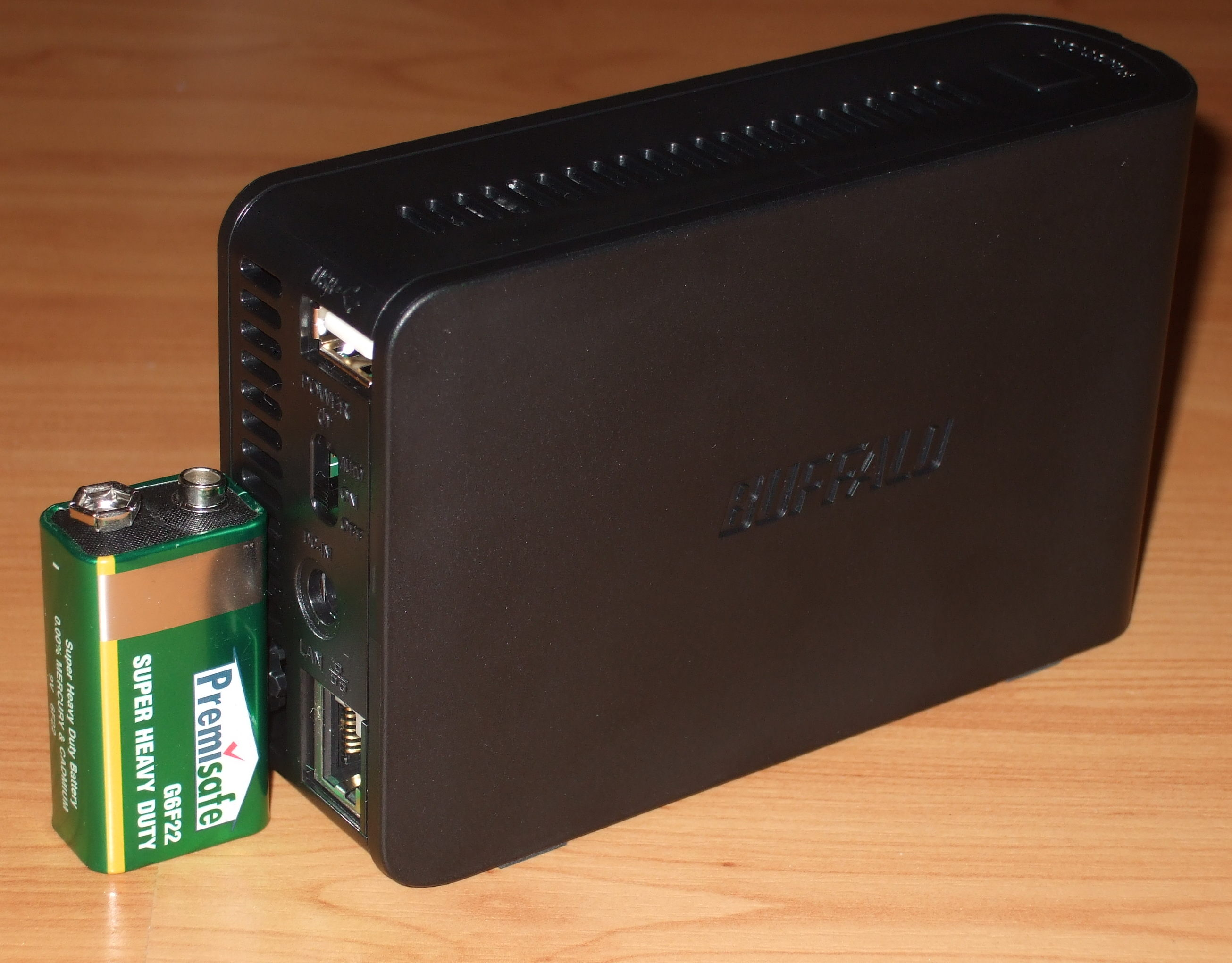
LinkStation Mini and PP3 battery

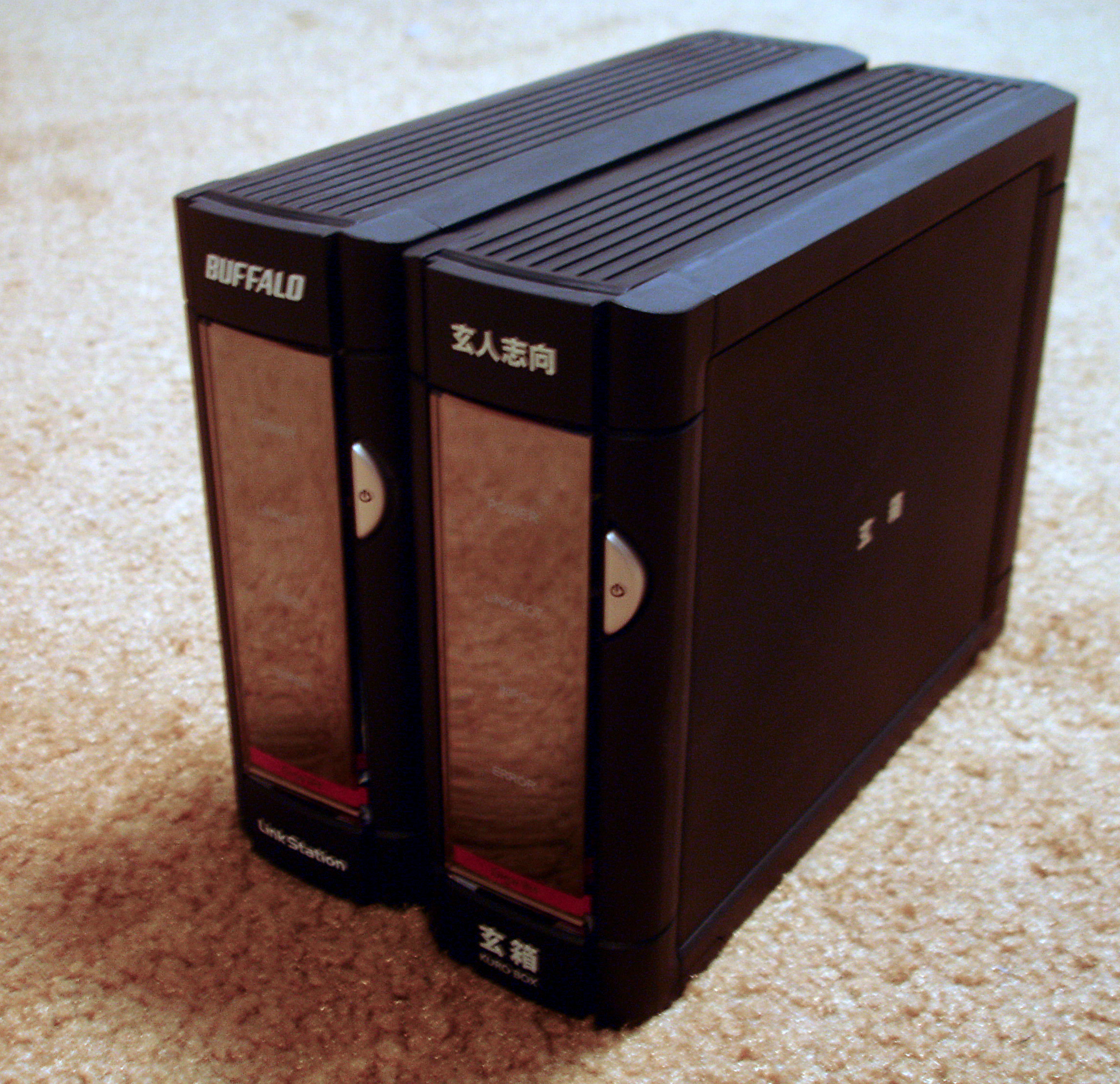
LinkStation Pro and KuroBox Pro

Kuro-box pro

Kuro Box

Two TeraStations stacked

== See also ==
- NSLU2
