= Melco =

Japanese business

Melco Holdings Inc.
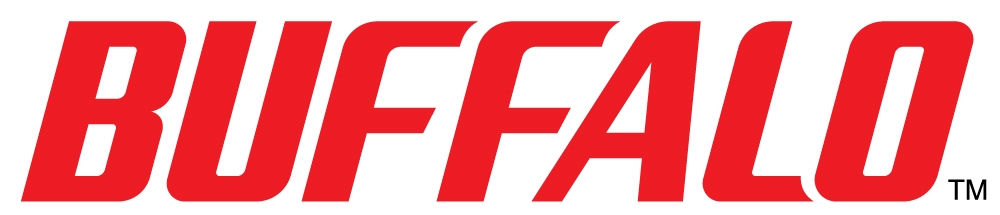

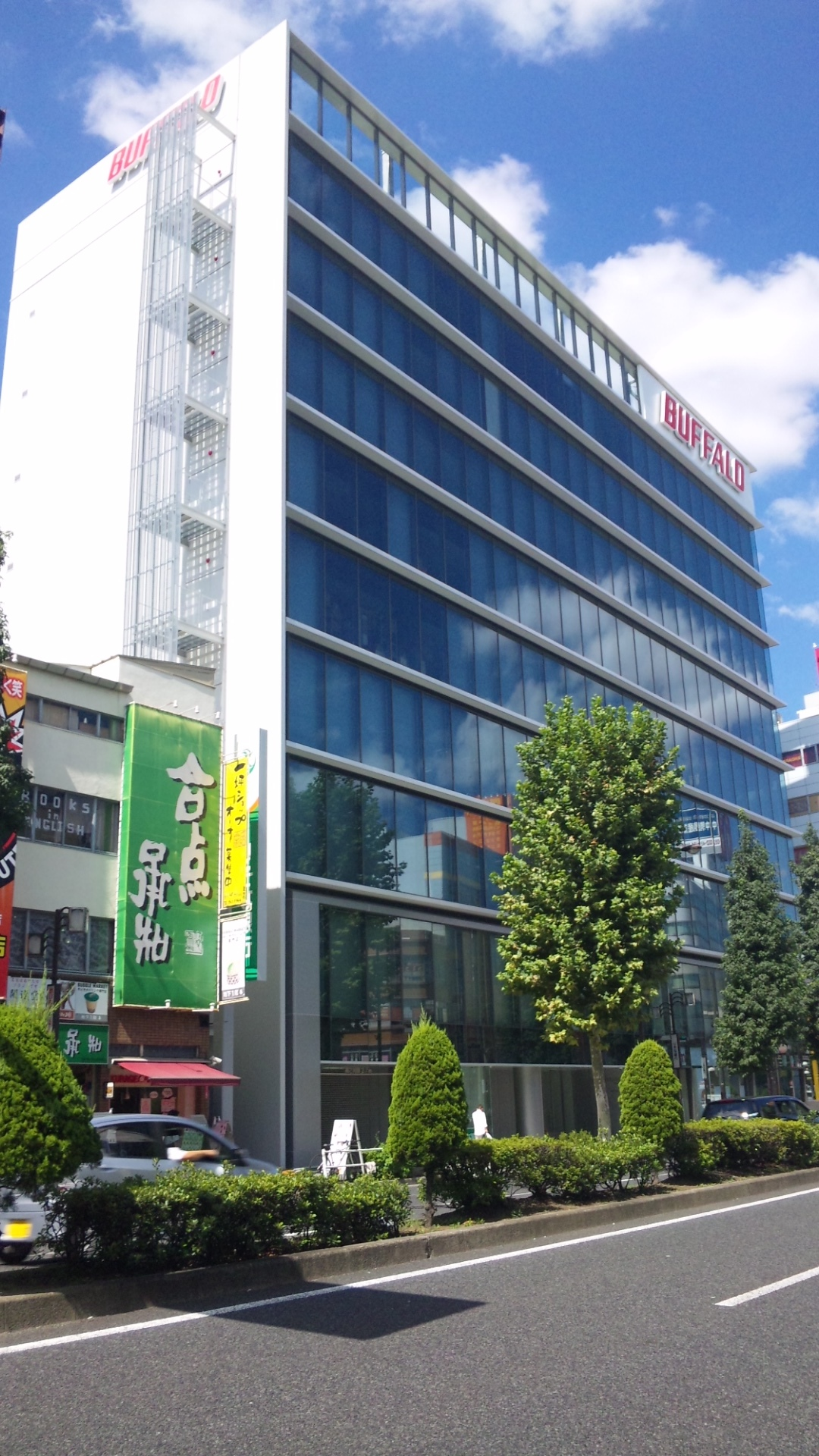
- Type: Public
- Traded as: TYO: 6676
- Industry: Computer hardware
- Founded: 1975; 51 years ago in Japan
- Founder: Makoto Maki
- Headquarters: Nagoya, Aichi, Japan
- Key people: Makoto Maki (CEO)
- Products: Electronics
- Revenue: JPY134.547 billion
- Number of employees: 50 MELCO group related: 824
- Website: www.melcoinc.com

Melco Holdings Inc. is a family business founded by Makoto Maki in 1975 and is located in Japan. The company's most recognizable brand is Buffalo Inc.

== Name ==
Melco's name stands for Maki Engineering Laboratory COmpany.

== History ==
Melco Holdings Inc. was incorporated in 1986; currently its subsidiaries are involved in the manufacture of random-access memory products, Flash memory products, USB products, CD-ROM/DVD-RW drives, hard disk drives, local area network products, printer buffers, liquid-crystal displays, Microsoft Windows accelerators, personal computer components and CPU accelerators. A subsidiary of Melco provides corporate services in Japan like Internet set-up, computer terminal installation/set-up, computer education and computer maintenance. The company has also started selling solid-state drives in Japan. Another subsidiary provides the Kuroutoshikou line of PC components.

Buffalo Inc. is currently one of the 16 subsidiaries of Melco Holdings Inc. and is based in Austin, Texas. Initially founded as an audio equipment manufacturer, the company entered the computer peripheral market in 1981 with an EEPROM writer. The name BUFFALO is derived from one of company's first products, a printer buffer and the name for the American Bison (Buffalo).

=== A Timeline of Firsts ===
January 1999 – First Wireless Router

December 2002 – First Draft-11g Wi-Fi Products Shipped

November 2003 – First NAS Appliance

January 2005 – First RAID NAS Appliance

April 2006 – First Draft-11n Wi-Fi Products Shipped

November 2009 – First USB 3.0 Storage

January 2012 – First Draft-11ac Wi-Fi Solution Demonstrated at CES

May 2012 – First Draft-11ac Wi-Fi products shipped

June 2012 – First Thunderbolt + USB 3.0 Hybrid Device

May 2013 – First DDR Memory Buffer DAS Drive

== Corporate structure ==
=== Melco divisions ===
Japan	CFD Sales Inc.; Buffalo Technology (Japan); Buffalo Logistics Inc.; Buffalo Lease Inc.; Buffalo Direct Inc.; Melco Personal Support Inc.; Buffalo IT Solutions Inc.; Liberty Shipping Inc.; Buffalo Kokuyo Supply Inc.
Asia	Buffalo Technology (Taiwan) Inc.; Buffalo Technology (Korea); Melco Asset Management PTE. LTD.
U.S.A.	Buffalo Technology (USA), Inc.
Europe	Buffalo Technology UK Limited; Buffalo Technology Ireland Limited; Buffalo Technology Deutschland

== Products ==
- Nintendo Wi-Fi USB Connector
- Buffalo network-attached storage series
- External hard drive
- HD DVD Computer Drive
- AirStation (Residential gateway)
- AOSS
- Memory - SO-DIMM and DIMM
- USB flash drive
- UPnP Media Rendering Hardware
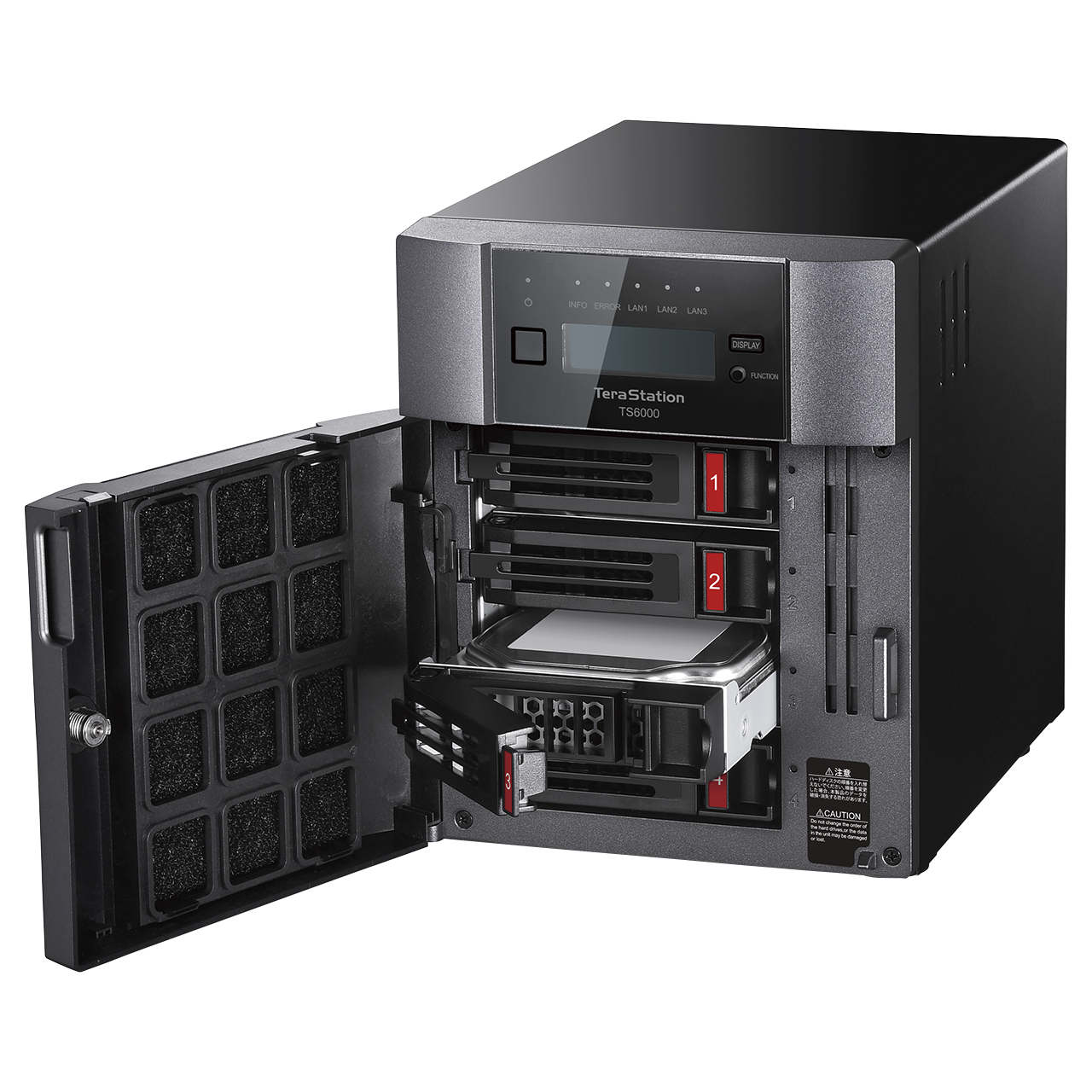
TeraStation with Hard Drives Included

Kuro Box Pro

Kuro Box HG-WR

Linkstation HG

Terastation

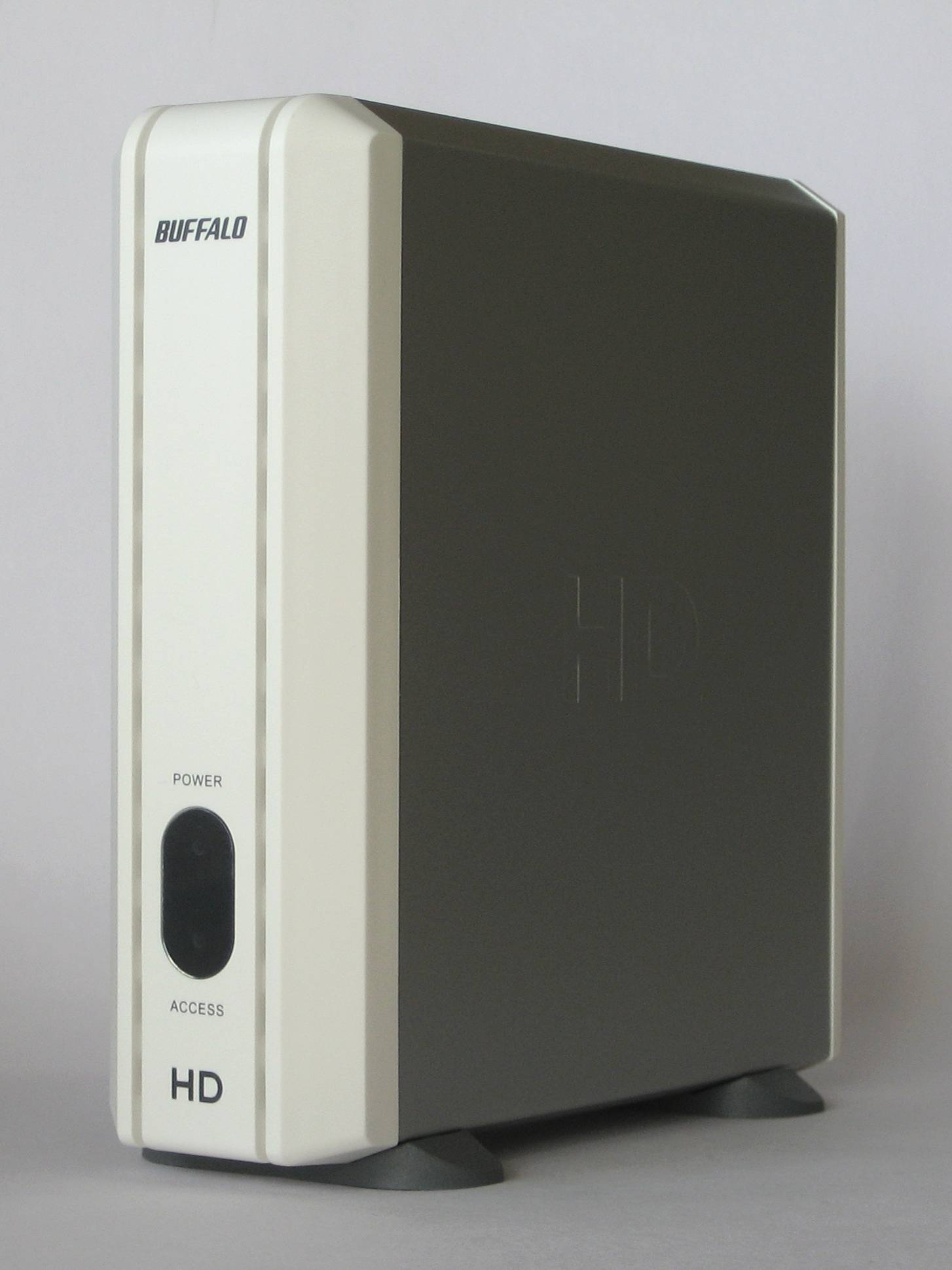
Drivestation external hard drive

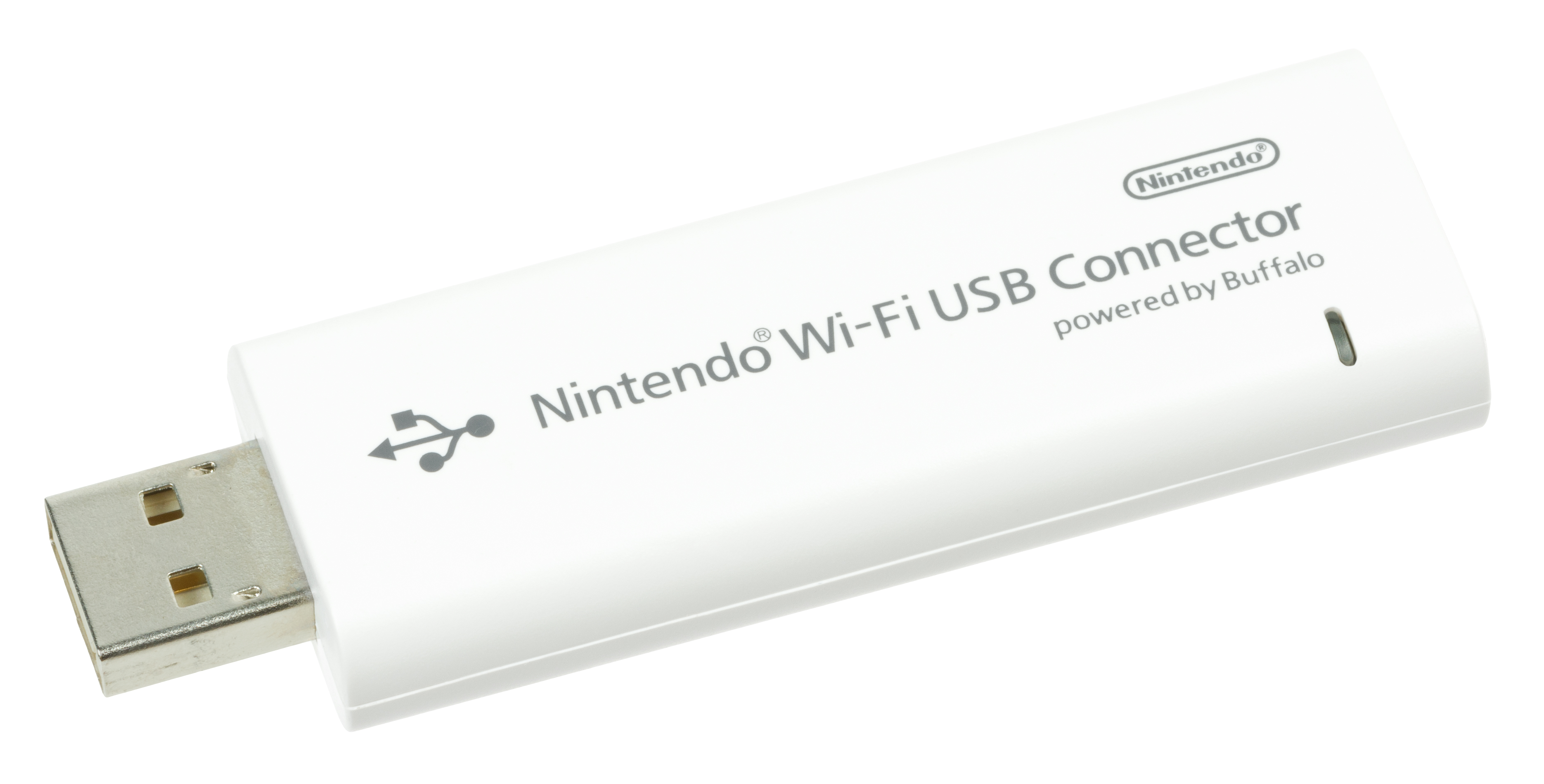
Nintendo Wi-Fi USB Connector

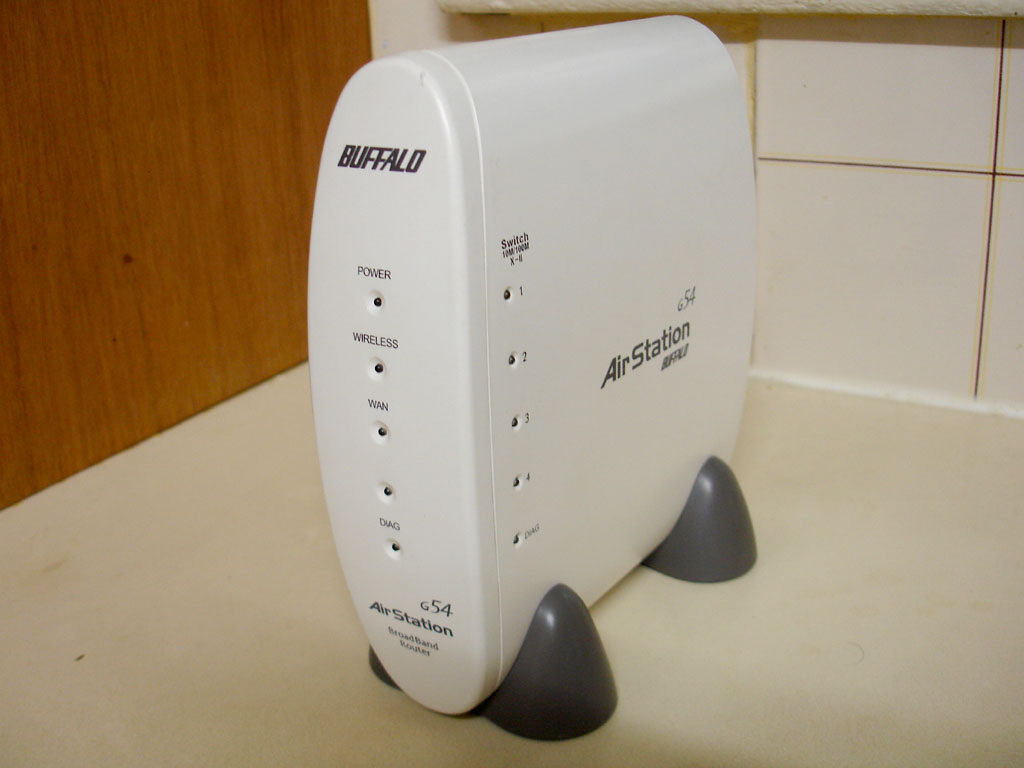
A Buffalo AirStation

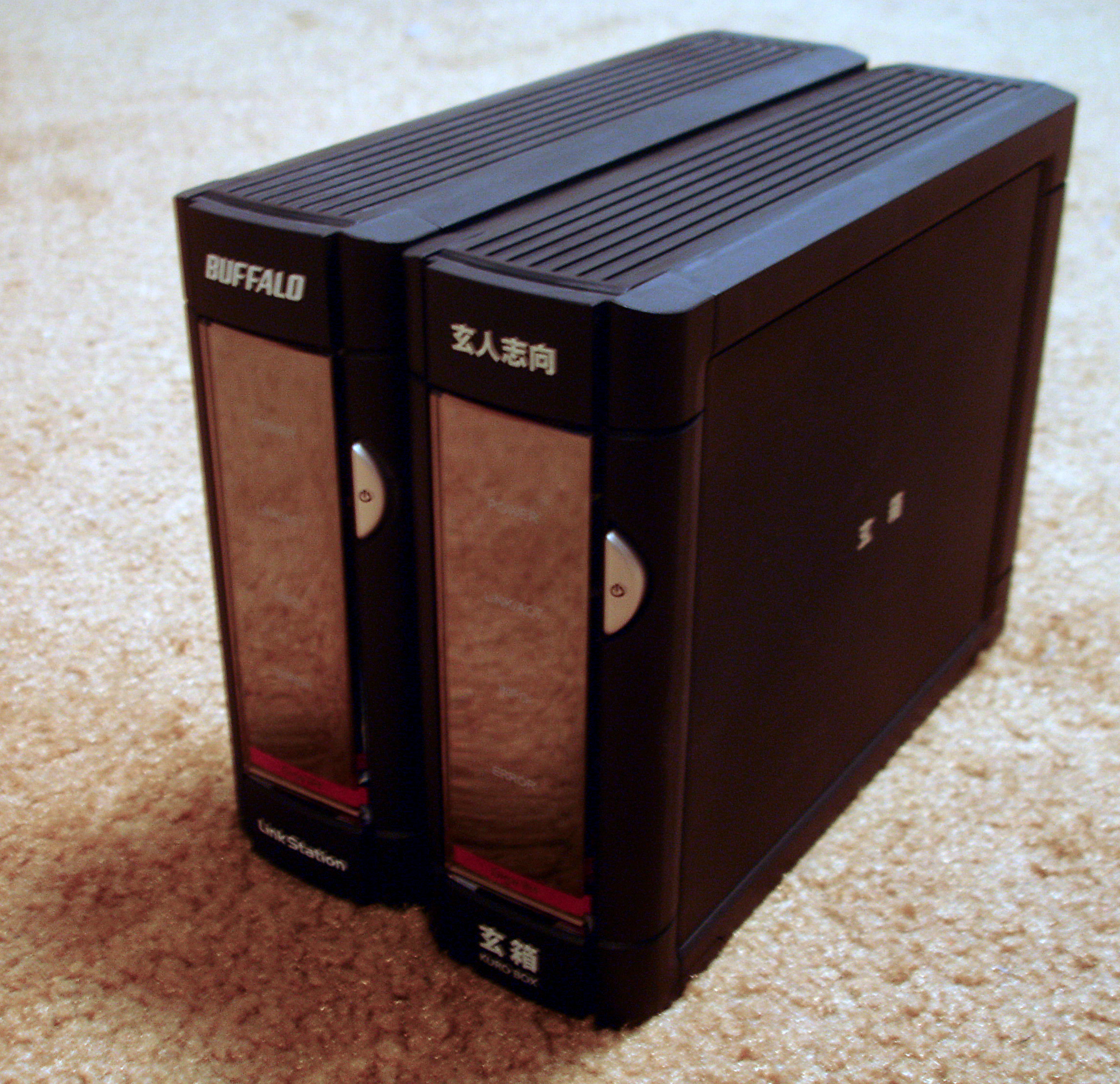
LinkStation Pro and KuroBox Pro

== Litigation ==
In late 2006, the Australian Commonwealth Scientific and Industrial Research Organisation (CSIRO) won a lawsuit against Buffalo Inc. under which it would receive a royalty for every WLAN product worldwide. The lawsuits basis was that CSIRO was granted US patent 5487069 in 1996, which grants elements of 802.11a/g wireless technology that had become an industry standard. In June 2007, the federal court in Texas granted an injunction to prevent any more wireless products from shipping until a license agreement had been reached. On September 19, 2008, the Federal Circuit ruled in Buffalo's favor and has remanded this case to the district court ruling that the district court's Summary Judgment was insufficient on the merits of obviousness of CSIRO's patent. Therefore, this case will be tried again before the district court. In this connection Buffalo is hopeful that it will shortly be permitted to, once again, sell IEEE 802.11a and 802.11g compliant products in the United States.

== See also ==
- AirStation
- Buffalo network-attached storage series
