= Nintendo Wi-Fi USB Connector =

Discontinued wireless game adapter

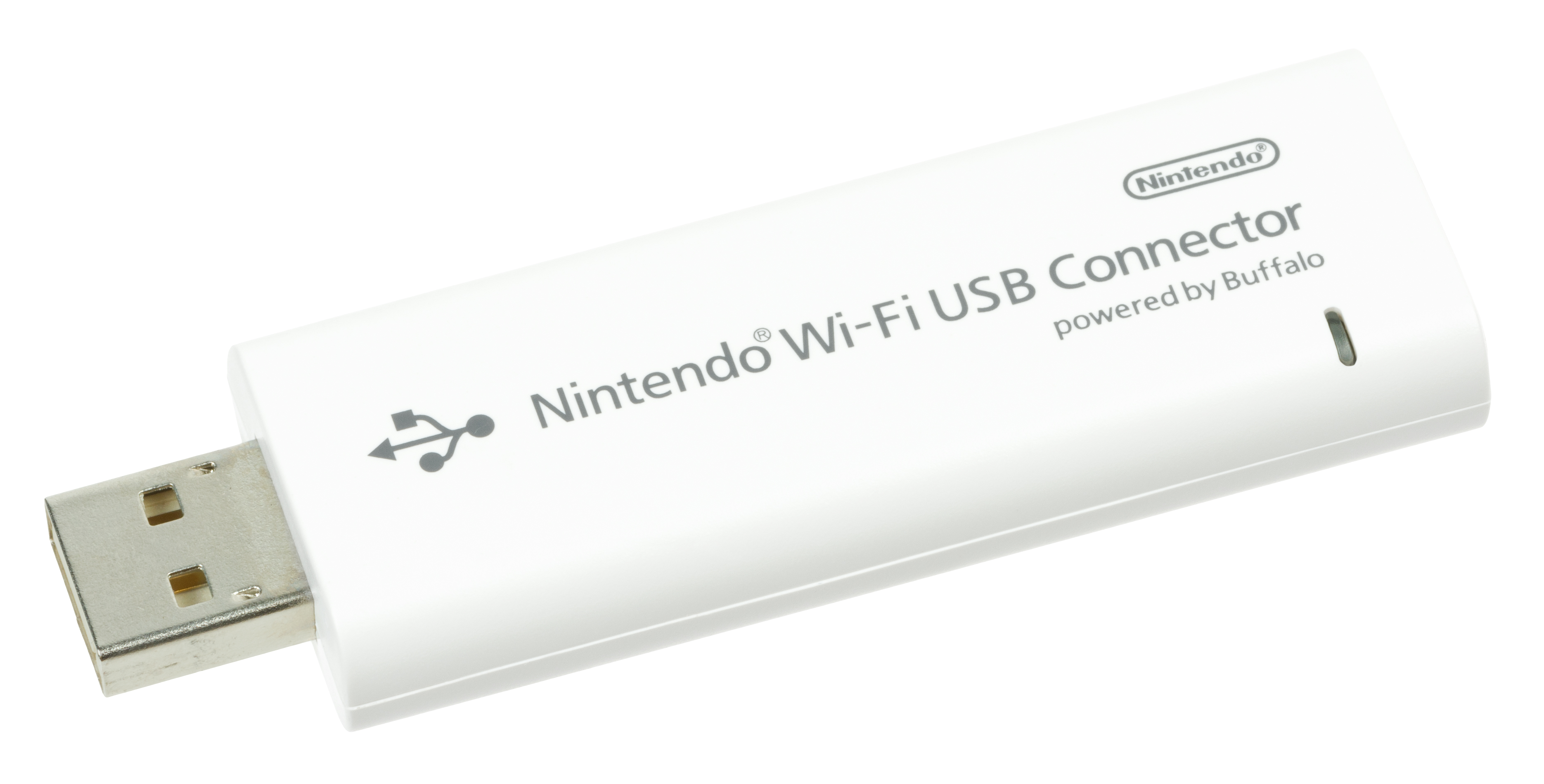
The Nintendo Wi-Fi USB Connector

The Nintendo Wi-Fi USB Connector is a wireless game adapter, developed by Nintendo and Buffalo Technology, which allows the Nintendo DS, Wii and 3DS users without a Wi-Fi connection or compatible Wi-Fi network to establish an Internet connection via a broadband-connected PC. When inserted into the host PC's USB port, the connector functions with the Nintendo DS, Wii, DSi and 3DS, permitting the user to connect to the Internet and play Nintendo games that require a Wi-Fi connection and access various other online services. According to the official Nintendo website, this product was the best-selling Nintendo accessory to date on 15 November 2007, but was discontinued in the same month. On September 9, 2005, Nintendo announced the Nintendo Wi-Fi Network Adapter, an 802.11g wireless router/bridge which serves a similar purpose.

== Functionality ==
The Nintendo Wi-Fi USB Connector is essentially a re-branded version of the Buffalo WLI-U2-KG54-YB. The Buffalo WLI-U2-KG54-YB is often confused for the Buffalo WLI-U2-KG54-AI because the two adapters are almost identical, and only differ in that the Buffalo WLI-U2-KG54-AI features flash memory to allow for auto installation. Both are based on the Ralink RT2570 chipset. This differentiated the Nintendo Wi-Fi USB Connector from most other Wi-Fi adapters as it could operate as a software access point (also known as a soft AP). At the time of the Nintendo Wi-Fi USB Connector's release, few Wi-Fi adapters could do this on the Windows operating system as Windows lacked both the software necessary to configure a soft AP and capable drivers that were natively supported by hardware. By bundling a soft AP compatible device with their own proprietary software, Nintendo was able to overcome the limitations of Windows and simplified the otherwise complicated process of putting a supported device into soft AP mode, configuring it, and routing Internet traffic over it.

Additionally, a number of community development tools and drivers exist which expand the functionality of the Nintendo Wi-Fi USB Connector beyond its initial design. While not officially supported by Nintendo, the USB Connector can function as a standard wireless adapter by using modified Ralink or Buffalo Technology drivers and can be used to send official game demos and homebrew software to the Nintendo DS through the Wireless Multi Boot (WMB) protocol.

== Criticism ==
=== Proprietary authentication ===
The product uses a proprietary authentication mechanism. Thus, the Wi-Fi USB Connector works only with approved devices, which is limited to the Nintendo DS and Wii consoles. This behavior is an intentional design decision on the part of Nintendo, as it prevents outside parties from connecting to the Nintendo Wi-Fi USB Connector with their computers and accessing the user's Internet connection or computer. While the Wi-Fi USB Connector can be modified to bypass this, it is unsupported by Nintendo.

=== Operating system support ===
Initially, the Nintendo Wi-Fi USB Connector only supported Microsoft Windows XP. A main concern at the time was the lack of support for older versions of Windows, principally Windows 2000. However, after the introduction of the Windows Vista operating system, criticism shifted to a lack of support for the new platform. Though Vista drivers were eventually released by Nintendo of Europe and Nintendo of America, it was two years after the first Windows XP drivers were available and several months after Vista's launch. There is no official support for Windows 7/8/10/11 (although it is possible to install working drivers when under compatibility mode).

It is possible to use the Nintendo Wi-Fi USB Connector as a USB Wi-Fi NIC to connect to other access points under Linux and BSD when using the appropriate drivers.

=== Internet connection sharing ===
The core functionality of the Nintendo Wi-Fi USB Connector is provided by Windows' Internet Connection Sharing (ICS) feature, which allows a Windows computer to act as a router and automatically configure client devices for Internet access. Due to limitations in ICS, there are a number of caveats with this method.

Like the Wi-Fi USB Connector software itself, ICS offers the user no configurable options. This means that ICS may not function as expected, or at all, in complex network environments. In addition, Windows cannot handle multiple ICS configurations simultaneously, or in other words, only a single application or network device can use and configure ICS at one time. If a network is currently relying on ICS or is using software that utilizes it (such as Windows Media Center Extender for the Xbox 360), the Wi-Fi USB Connector may not be usable.

=== Software firewall compatibility ===
Though not an innate fault with the Wi-Fi USB Connector itself, due to the nature of the device, a software firewall like those commonly installed on Microsoft Windows computers hosting the Wi-Fi USB Connector will interfere with its operation. To alleviate this issue, the user must allow the software full access to the Internet, or manually specify acceptable port ranges to allow through the firewall; depending on how that particular firewall is configured.

Unfortunately, some firewall products, such as ZoneAlarm and Windows Live OneCare, are incompatible with the Wi-Fi USB Connector software. Therefore, these programs must be either uninstalled or disabled, leaving the computer open to possible attack from external sources. The user's only option in this scenario is to risk connecting to the Internet unprotected or install a different firewall product.

=== Network topology ===
One common complaint from more advanced users is the lack of user-configurable options in the Wi-Fi USB Connector software and installer. Novice users see this as a much-welcomed advantage of the Nintendo Wi-Fi USB Connector over a traditional wireless router, but for users who wish to use the device in a more complicated network environment, it can be an insurmountable obstacle.

For example, the Nintendo Wi-Fi USB Connector will cause an IP conflict if an existing network is using the 192.168.0.x or 192.168.1.x IP schemes, both common IP ranges used in consumer routers.

== Packaging ==
The Nintendo Wi-Fi USB Connector includes a USB extension cable, a manual, and a software CD. It is recommended that the latest version of the Wi-Fi USB Connector software should be downloaded and installed rather than using the CD versions, as important updates have been made in the newer versions. Devices shipped with software driver versions below 1.05 are incompatible with Windows Vista until updated.

== Discontinuation ==
While Nintendo has not stated a reason for the discontinuation of the device, manufacturers Buffalo Technology were reportedly no longer licensed to distribute it due to a successful lawsuit by the Australian Government's technology research agency CSIRO (Commonwealth Scientific and Industrial Research Organization). As a result, the company was prevented from trading in any products adhering to the 802.11a/g standards in the US, including the Nintendo Wi-Fi USB connector.

Nintendo, however, only states on their website that the device is discontinued, and offers a standard wireless router as replacement on the Wii:

"Please note: The Nintendo Wi-Fi USB Connector has been discontinued until further notice. As an alternative for online access, Wii owners can use a standard wireless router, or the Wii LAN Adapter."
