= Buffalo AirStation =

Wireless network equipment product line

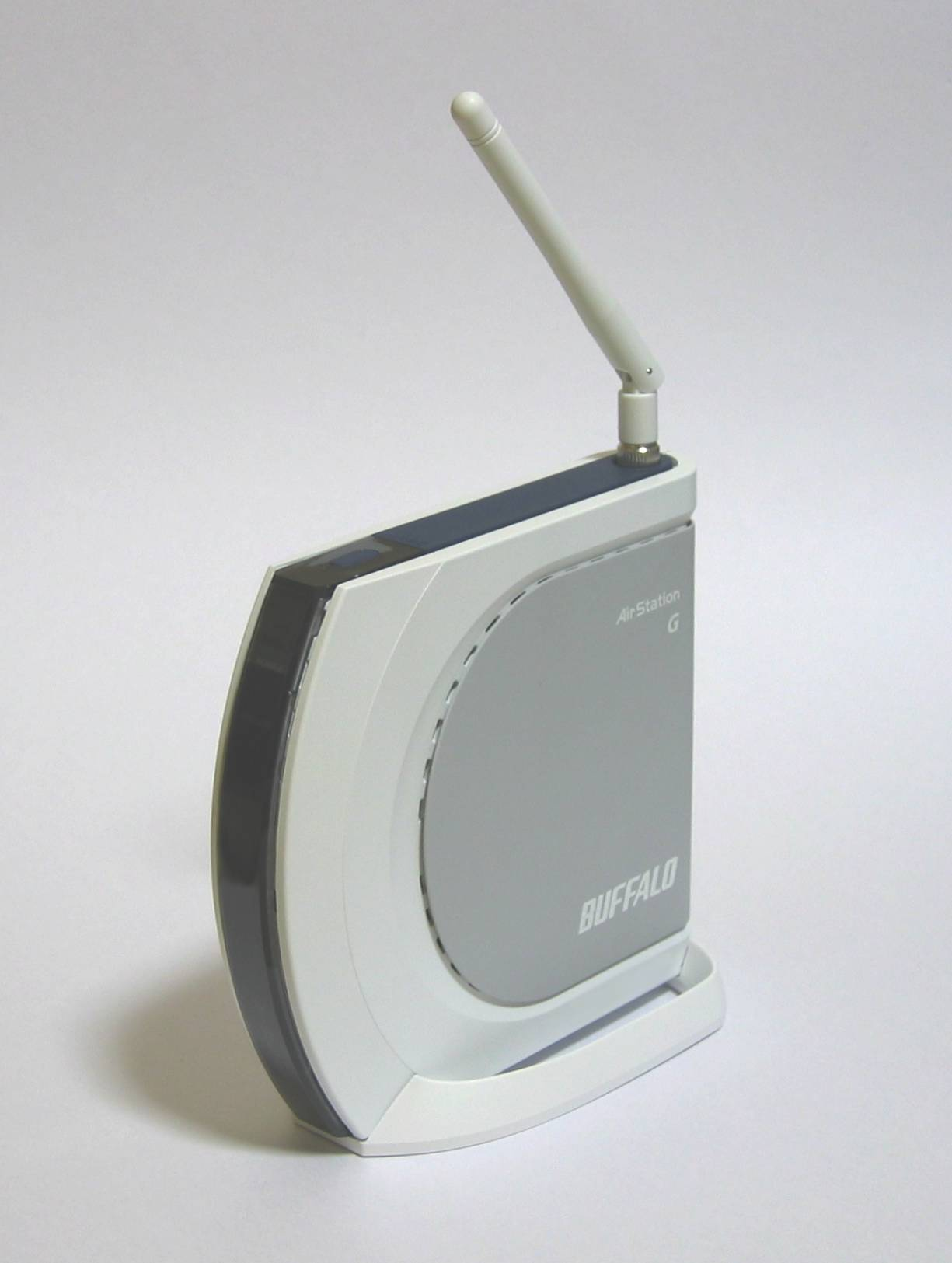
Buffalo AirStation WHR-G54S

Buffalo AirStation is the name given to a series of wireless LAN equipment sold by Buffalo Technology.

== Products ==
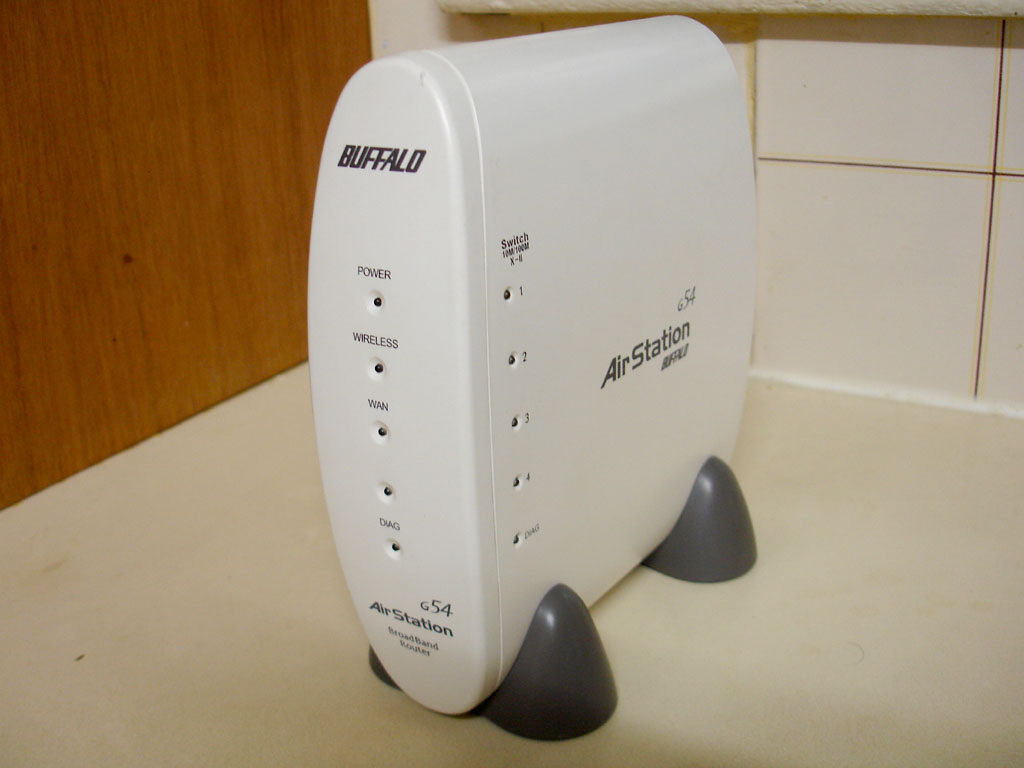
A Buffalo AirStation WBR-G54 residential gateway.

- Residential gateways
- Wireless LAN cards

== Use with third party firmware ==
Many of Buffalo's residential gateways use Broadcom microprocessor chipsets, allowing a variety of third party open source firmware to be installed. Some of their most recent routers with Atheros-based chipsets are shipped by Buffalo with a branded version of DD-WRT already installed.

== CSIRO controversy ==
In late November 2007, Buffalo announced they would temporarily stop supplying wireless LAN products in the USA due to the ongoing lawsuit filed by the 802.11a, 802.11g and 802.11n patent holder CSIRO.

== Buffalo Routers ==
=== WAP series ===
| Model | Hardware rev | 1st seen on Market | FCC ID | Platform & Frequency [MHz] | RAM [MB] | Flash Memory [MB] | Wireless NIC | WLAN standard [802.11] | mini PCI | Serial port | JTAG port | Ethernet port count | PoE | Voltage Input [V/A] |
|---|---|---|---|---|---|---|---|---|---|---|---|---|---|---|
| WAPM-HP-AM54G54 | ? | ? | ? | Broadcom4704@264 | 64 | 8 | Broadcom | a/b/g/h | - | 1 | 1 | 4 PORT ADM6996M | - | 5V |

=== WBR series ===
| Model | Hardware rev | 1st seen on Market | FCC ID | Platform & Frequency [MHz] | RAM [MB] | Flash Memory [MB] | Wireless NIC | WLAN standard [802.11] | mini PCI | Serial port | JTAG port | Ethernet port count | PoE | Voltage Input [V/A] |
|---|---|---|---|---|---|---|---|---|---|---|---|---|---|---|
| WBR-B11 | - | | | | | | | a/b | | | | 4 LAN/1 WAN | - | |
| WBR-G54 | OpenWRT compatible (dd-wrt forum) | ? | ? | Broadcom4710@125 | 16 | 4 | Broadcom | b/g | 1? | ? | ? | 4 LAN/1 WAN | - | 3,3V/2A |
| WBR2-G54 | - | ? | FDI-04600142-0 | Broadcom4712@200 | 16 | 4 | Broadcom | b/g | - | 1 | 1 | 4 LAN/1 WAN | - | 3,3V/1,1A |
| WBR2-G54S | - | ? | ? | Broadcom4712@200 | 16 | 4 | Broadcom | b/g | - | - | ? | 4 LAN/1 WAN | - | 3,3V/2A |

=== WCR series ===
| Model | Hardware rev | 1st seen on Market | FCC ID | Platform & Frequency [MHz] | RAM [MB] | Flash Memory [MB] | Wireless NIC | WLAN standard [802.11] | mini PCI | Serial port | JTAG port | Ethernet port count | PoE | Voltage Input [V/A] |
|---|---|---|---|---|---|---|---|---|---|---|---|---|---|---|
| WCR-G54 | - | 2008? | ? | Atheros AR8216? | 8MB | 4MB | Atheros AR2317 | b/g | - | No | - | 3 LAN/1 WAN | - | 3,3V/2A |
| WCR-GN | - | Q3 2010 | FDI-09101676-0 | Ralink RT3350F@320 MHz | 16M | 4M | Ralink | b/g/n | - | No | - | 4 LAN/1 WAN | - | 12V/1A |

=== WHR series ===
| Model | Hardware rev | 1st seen on Market | FCC ID | Platform & Frequency [MHz] | RAM [MB] | Flash Memory [MB] | Wireless NIC | WLAN standard [802.11] | mini PCI | Serial port | JTAG port | Ethernet port count | PoE | Voltage Input [V/A] |
|---|---|---|---|---|---|---|---|---|---|---|---|---|---|---|
| WHR-G125 | - | Germany:Q1/2007 | FDI-09101584-0 | Broadcom 5354 @ 240 MHz | 16 MB | 4 MB | Broadcom | b/g | - | - | ? | 4 LAN/1 WAN | - | 3.3V/1A |
| WHR-G (Japan equivalent of WHR-G125) | - | May 2008 | N/A | Broadcom 5354 @ 240 MHz | 16 MB | 4 MB | Broadcom | b/g | - | JP1 | JP2 (14pin) | 4 LAN/1 WAN | - | 3.3V/1.2A |
| WHR-G300N | V1, DD-WRT compatible | ? | FDI-09101538-0 | Ralink 3052 @ 384 MHz | 32 MB | 4 MB | Ralink | b/g/n | - | ? | ? | 4 LAN/1 WAN | - | 12V/2.0A? |
| WHR-G300N | V2 | ? | FDI-09101561 | Atheros 7240 @ 400 MHz | 32 MB | 4 MB | Atheros | b/g/n | - | ? | ? | 4 LAN/1 WAN | - | 12V/1A |
| WHR-G54S | DD-WRT V24-SP2 compatible | ? | FDI—04600264-0 | Broadcom 5352 @ 200 MHz | 16 MB | 4 MB | Broadcom | b/g | - | - | ? | 4 LAN/1 WAN | - | 3.3V/2A |
| WHR-HP-AG108 | ? | ? | FDI-09101540-0 | Atheros 5312 @ 220 MHz | 32 MB | 4 MB | Atheros | a/b/g/h | - | 1 | ? | 4 LAN/1 WAN | - | 5V/2A |
| WHR-HP-AMPG (Japan equivalent of WHR-HP-AG108) | ? | ? | FDI-09101540-0 | Atheros 5312 @ 220 MHz | 32 MB | 4 MB | Atheros | a/b/g/h | - | 1 | ? | 4 LAN/1 WAN | - | 5V/2A |
| WHR-HP-G300N | DD-WRT pre-installed | ? | FDI-09101621-0 | Atheros 7240 @ 400 MHz | 32 MB | 4 MB | Atheros | b/g/n | No | 1 (need hardware pins) | 1 (need hardware pins) | 4 LAN/1 WAN | No | 5V/2.3A |
| WHR-HP-G54 | Tomato, DD-WRT compatible | ? | FDI-09101577-0 | Broadcom 5352 @ 200 MHz | 16 MB | 4 MB | Broadcom | b/g | No | Internal (+3.3V TTL, not RS232) | ? | 4 LAN/1 WAN | No | 5V/0.9A |
| WHR-HP-G54-DD | - | ? | FDI-09101577-0 | Broadcom 5352 @ 200 MHz | 16 MB | 4 MB | Broadcom | b/g | - | - | ? | 4 LAN/1 WAN | - | 5V/0.9A |
| WHR-HP-G54S | - | ? | ? | Broadcom ? @ ? MHz | 16 MB ? | 4 MB ? | Broadcom | b/g? | - | ? | ? | 4 LAN/1 WAN? | - | 5V/0.9A? |
| WHR-HP-GN | - | ? | FDI-09101567-0 | Atheros 7240 @ 400 MHz | 32 MB | 4 MB | Broadcom | b/g/n | - | ? | ? | 4 LAN/1 WAN | - | 5V/2.3A |
| WHR2-A54G54 | - | ? | ? | Broadcom 4704 @ 264 MHz | 16 MB ? | 4 MB ? | Broadcom | b/g? | - | ? | ? | 4 LAN/1 WAN? | - | 5V/0.9A? |
| WHR3-AG54 | - | ? | ? | Broadcom 4704 @ 264 MHz | 64 MB ? | 4 MB ? | Broadcom | b/g? | - | ? | ? | 4 LAN/1 WAN | - | 3.3V/2A |

=== WLA series ===
| Model | Hardware rev | 1st seen on Market | FCC ID | Platform & Frequency [MHz] | RAM [MB] | Flash Memory [MB] | Wireless NIC | WLAN standard [802.11] | mini PCI | Serial port | JTAG port | Ethernet port count | PoE | Voltage Input [V/A] |
|---|---|---|---|---|---|---|---|---|---|---|---|---|---|---|
| WLA-G54 | - | ? | ? | Broadcom4702@125 | 16 | 4 | Broadcom | b/g | 1 | - | ? | 4 LAN | - | 3,3V/?A |
| WLA-G54C | - | ? | ? | Broadcom4702@125 | 16 | 4 | Broadcom | b/g | -? | - | ? | 1 LAN | - | 3,3V/?A? |
| WLA2-G54C | - | ? | ? | Broadcom4702@200 | 16 | 4 | Broadcom | b/g | - | 1 | 1 | 1 LAN | - | 3,3V/2A |
| WLA2-G54L | - | ? | ? | Broadcom4702@200? | 16 | 4 | Broadcom | b/g | - | 1 | 1 | 4 LAN | - | 3,3V/?A? |
| WLAE-AG300N | - | ? | FDI-09101592-0 | AtherosAR7240@400 | 32 | 4 | AtherosAR9280 | a/b/g/n | - | - | ? | 2 LAN | - | AC direct |
| WLAH-G54 | - | ? | ? | Broadcom4702@200? | 16 | 4 | Broadcom | b/g? | - | 1 | 1 | 1 LAN? | - | 3,3V/?A? |
| WLAH-A54G54 (only Japan, WLAH-G54 plus "a" WiFi) | - | ? | ? | Broadcom4702@200? | 16 | 4 | Broadcom | a/b/g | - | 1 | 1 | 4 LAN | - | 3,3V/2A |

=== WLI series ===
| Model | Hardware rev | 1st seen on Market | FCC ID | Platform & Frequency [MHz] | RAM [MB] | Flash Memory [MB] | Wireless NIC | WLAN standard [802.11] | mini PCI | Serial port | JTAG port | Ethernet port count | PoE | Voltage Input [V/A] |
|---|---|---|---|---|---|---|---|---|---|---|---|---|---|---|
| WLI-TX1-G54 | - | ? | QDS-BRCM1005 | Broadcom5352@200? | 16 | 4 | Broadcom | b/g | - | ? | 1 | 1 LAN | - | 3,3V/?A? |
| WLI-TX4-G54HP | - | ? | FDI-09101577-0 | Broadcom5352@200 | 16 | 4 | Broadcom | b/g | - | ? | ? | 4 LAN | - | 5V/.9A |
| WLI-TX1-G54 | - | ? | QDS-BRCM1005 | Broadcom5352@200? | 16 | 4 | Broadcom | b/g | - | ? | 1 | 1 LAN | - | 3,3V/?A? |
| WLI-TX4-AG300N | - | ? | ? | - | ? | ? | ? | a/b/g/n | - | ? | ? | 4 LAN | - | ? |
| WLI2-TX1-G54 | - | ? | ? | Broadcom5352@200? | 16 | 4 | Broadcom | b/g? | - | ? | ? | 4 LAN? | - | 3,3V/?A? |
| WLI3-TX1-G54 | - | ? | ? | Broadcom5352@200? | 16 | 4 | Broadcom | b/g? | - | ? | ? | 4 LAN? | - | 5V/?A? |

=== WVR series ===
| Model | Hardware rev | 1st seen on Market | FCC ID | Platform & Frequency [MHz] | RAM [MB] | Flash Memory [MB] | Wireless NIC | WLAN standard [802.11] | mini PCI | Serial port | JTAG port | Ethernet port count | PoE | Voltage Input [V/A] |
|---|---|---|---|---|---|---|---|---|---|---|---|---|---|---|
| WVR-G54-NF | - | ? | ? | Broadcom4704@264 | 64 | 8 | Broadcom4706 | b/g | 1 | 1 (need hardware pins) | 1 (need hardware pins) | 4LAN/1WAN | - | ?V/?A |

=== WYR series ===
| Model | Hardware rev | 1st seen on Market | FCC ID | Platform & Frequency [MHz] | RAM [MB] | Flash Memory [MB] | Wireless NIC | WLAN standard [802.11] | mini PCI | Serial port | JTAG port | Ethernet port count | PoE | Voltage Input [V/A] |
|---|---|---|---|---|---|---|---|---|---|---|---|---|---|---|
| WYR-G54 | ? | ? | ? | ? | 2 MB | 1 MB | ? | ? | - | - | ? | 4 LAN/ 1 WAN | - | ? |

=== WZR series ===
| Model | Hardware rev | 1st seen on Market | FCC ID | Platform & Frequency [MHz] | RAM [MB] | Flash Memory [MB] | Wireless NIC | WLAN standard [802.11] | mini PCI | Serial port | JTAG port | Ethernet port count | PoE | Voltage Input [V/A] |
|---|---|---|---|---|---|---|---|---|---|---|---|---|---|---|
| WZR-G144NH | ? | ? | ? | Broadcom 4785 @ 300 MHz | 32 MB | 4 MB | Broadcom | b/g/n | - | - | ? | 4 Gb LAN/1 WAN | - | ? |
| WZR-AMPG144NH (equivalents: WZR-AMPG300NH, WZR-AG300NH) | ? | ? | ? | Marvell MV88F5181-Rev-B1 (Orion SoC) @ 333 MHz | 32 MB | 8 MB | Marvell 88W8363-BEM1 | b/g/n | - | - | ? | 4 Gb LAN/1 Gb WAN | - | ? |
| WZR-G300N | - | ? | ? | Broadcom 4704 @ 264 MHz | 16 MB ? | 4 MB ? | Broadcom | b/g | - | ? | ? | 4 LAN/1 WAN | - | 12V, 1.25A |
| WZR-G54 | - | ? | ? | Broadcom 4704 @ 264 MHz | 16 MB ? | 4 MB ? | Broadcom | b/g? | - | ? | ? | ? | ? | ? |
| WZR-HP-G300NH | v.1 and v.2, dd-wrt preinstalled, proprietary fw available | ? | FDI-09101560-0 | Atheros 9132 @ 400 MHz | 64 MB | 32 MB | Atheros | b/g/n | - | 1(3.3v) | ? | 4 Gb LAN/1 Gb WAN | - | 12V, 1.5A |
| WZR-HP-G450H | v.1, dd-wrt preinstalled, proprietary fw available | ? | FDI-09101912-0 | Atheros AR7242 @ 400mhz | 64 MB | 32 MB | Atheros | b/g/n | - | ? | ? | 4 Gb LAN/1 Gb WAN | - | 12V, 1.5A |
| WZR-HP-G54 | - | ? | ? | Broadcom 4704 @ 264 MHz | 16 MB ? | 4 MB ? | Broadcom | b/g? | - | ? | ? | ? | ? | ? |
| WZR-RS-G54 (equivalents: BHR-4RV Japanese variant without WiFi) | ? | ? | ? | Broadcom 4704 @ 264 MHz | 64 MB | 8 MB | ? | ? | ? | ? | ? | 4 LAN/1 WAN | - | 3.3V, 1.5A |
| WZR-HP-AG300H | v.1, dd-wrt preinstalled, proprietary fw available | Q1/2011 | FDI-09101889-0 | Atheros AR7161 rev 2 @ 680 MHz | 128 MB | 32 MB | Atheros | a/b/g/n | ? | Yes | Yes | 4 Gb LAN/1 Gb WAN | - | 12V, 2A |
| WZR-600DHP | v2, dd-wrt preinstalled, proprietary fw available | Q3/2012 | FDI-09101889-0 | Atheros AR7161 rev 2 @ 680 MHz | 128 MB | 32 MB | Atheros | IEEE802.11n/g/a/b | ? | Yes | Yes | 4 Gb LAN/1 GB WAN | - | 12V, 2A |
| WZR-600DHP2 | v.1, proprietary fw, dd-wrt available | Q2/2013 | FDI 000000013 | Broadcom BCM47081A0 @800 | 256 MB | 128 MB | Broadcom | IEEE802.11n/g/a/b | ? | Yes | Yes | 4 Gb LAN/1 GB WAN | - | 12V, 3A |
| WZR-1750DHP | ? | Q2/2013 | ? | Broadcom BCM4708A0 (800 MHz, 2 cores) | 512MB | 128MB | Broadcom | IEEE802.11ac, IEEE802.11n/g/a/b | ? | ? | ? | 4 Gb LAN/1 Gb WAN | - | 12VDC 4A |

== See also ==
- List of wireless router firmware projects
